= Postal codes in Peru =

A Peruvian postal code (Peruvian Spanish: codigo postal) is a five-digit string that comprises part of a postal address in Peru. Prior to 2011, only the major cities of Lima and Callao used postal codes. However, in February 2011 a nationwide system was implemented which employs a five-digit numeric format. Similar to the postal codes of Mexico, Brazil, Australia, the United States, and elsewhere, postal codes in Peru are strictly numerical, using only numbers.

For example, the province of Chachapoyas contains portions of postal zones 010, 012, 013 and 014 whereas postal zone 011 is entirely within Bongará Province. Regardless, it can be understood that all five postal zones are within the Department of Amazonas, since they all begin with the digits 01.

An online tool to search for postal codes can be found here.

== Postal codes ==
The following chart lists the various postal codes in use throughout Peru. Each department or region is assigned a two-digit regional code. This makes up the beginning of the postal code. The final two digits comprise a geographic code which denotes a specific district or area within a district. The middle digit is not tied to administrative boundaries. Final digits other than "0" or "5" tend to denote urban or built-up areas, though this is not always the case.

Therefore, the postal code for the district of Jazan, in the Amazones Region, is 01130, whereas the postal code for the city of Pedro Ruiz Gallo within Jazan district, is 01131.

Similarly, while the district of Conchuccos has the postal code 02875, the urban city of the same name uses the postal code 02876.

Postal Zone	Geographic Codes and Districts	Provinces	Regions
010	00: Chachapoyas, Huancas 01: City of Chachapoyas	Chachapoyas	Amazonas
011	00: Valera 10: Churuja 20: San Carlos 30: Jazán 31: Pedro Ruiz Gallo 40: Cuispes 50: Florida 51: Pomacochas 60: Yambrasbamba 61: Monte Puyo Conservation Area	Bongará	Amazonas
012	00: Granada 10: Quinjalca 20: Chiliquín 30: Asunción 40: Recta 50: Jumbilla 60: Chisquilla 70: Corosha 80: Olleros	Chachapoyas Bongará	Amazonas
013	00: Sonche 05: Soloco 10: San Francisco de Daguas 15: Cheto 20: Molinopampa 25: Vista Alegre 30: Mariscal Benavides 35: San Nicolás 40: Omia 41: Omia 45: Longar 50: Cochamal 55: Huambo 60: Santa Rosa 65: Totora 70: Limabamba 75: Milpuc 80: Chirimoto	Chachapoyas Rodríguez de Mendoza	Amazonas
014	00: Levanto 05: San Isidro de Maino 10: Magdalena 15: Tingo 20: Colcamar 25: Longuita 30: María 35: San Juan de Lopecancha 40: La Jalca 41: Juan Velasco Alvarado University 45: Santo Tomás 50: San Francisco del Yeso 55: Mariscal Castilla 60: Montevideo 65: Leimebamba 70: Chuquibamba 75: Balsas 80: Cocabamba 85: Pisuquia 86: Chuilon	Chachapoyas Luya	Amazonas
015	00: Lonya Chico 05: Inguilpata 10: Luya 15: Lámud 20: San Cristóbal 25: San Jerónimo 30: Conila 35: Ocumal 40: Providencia 45: Ocalli 50: Camporredondo 51: Camporredondo (city) 55: Lonya Grande 56: Lonya Grande (city) 60: Yamón 65: Cumba 66: Cumba (city) 70: Trita 75: Luya Viejo 80: Santa Catalina	Luya Utcubamba	Amazonas
016	00: Shipasbamba 10: Jamalca 11: Jamalca (city) 20: Bagua Grande 21: Bagua Grande Village 30: El Milagro 31: El Milagro (city)	Utcubamba Bongará	Amazonas
017	00: Cajaruro 01: Cajaruro (city) 10: Copallín 11:Copallin (city) 20: Bagua 21: Bagua (town) 30: El Parco 40: La Peca 41: La Peca (village)	Utcubamba Bagua	Amazonas
018	00: Aramango 01: Aramango (town) 10: Imaza 11: Chiriaco 20: El Cenepa 21: Huampami 30: Nieva 31: Santa María de Nieva 40: Río Santiago 41: Puerto Galilea	Bagua Condorcanqui	Amazonas

Postal Zone	Geographic Codes and Districts	Provinces	Region
020			

== Historical postal codes ==
The historical list of postal codes from Lima and Callao is shown below. As of February 2011, these codes are no longer in use.

=== Lima ===
- Lima 01 = Cercado
- Lima 02 = Ancon
- Lima 03 = Ate
- Lima 04 = Barranco
- Lima 05 = Breña
- Lima 06 = Carabayllo
- Lima 07 = Comas
- Lima 08 = Chaclacayo
- Lima 09 = Chorrillos
- Lima 10 = El agustino
- Lima 11 = Jesús María
- Lima 12 = La Molina
- Lima 13 = La Victoria
- Lima 14 = Lince
- Lima 15 = Lurigancho
- Lima 16 = Lurin
- Lima 17 = Magdalena
- Lima 18 = Miraflores
- Lima 19 = Pachacamac
- Lima 20 = Pucusana
- Lima 21 = Pueblo Libre
- Lima 22 = Puente Piedra
- Lima 23 = Punta Negra
- Lima 24 = Punta Hermosa
- Lima 25 = Rimac
- Lima 26 = San Bartolo
- Lima 27 = San Isidro
- Lima 28 = Independencia
- Lima 29 = San Juan de Miraflores
- Lima 30 = San Luis
- Lima 31 = San Martin de Porres
- Lima 32 = San Miguel
- Lima 33 = Santiago de Surco
- Lima 34 = Surquillo
- Lima 35 = Villa María del Triunfo
- Lima 36 = San Juan de Lurigancho
- Lima 37 = Santa María del Mar
- Lima 38 = Santa Rosa
- Lima 39 = Los Olivos
- Lima 40 = Cieneguilla
- Lima 41 = San Borja
- Lima 42 = Villa el Salvador
- Lima 43 = Santa Anita

=== Callao ===
- CALLAO 01 : Callao District
- CALLAO 02 : Bellavista
- CALLAO 03 : Carmen de la Legua Reynoso
- CALLAO 04 : La Perla
- CALLAO 05 : La Punta
- CALLAO 06 : Ventanilla
