= Chacha language =

Extinct and poorly known language of Peru

Chacha
- Native to: Peru
- Region: Marañón River basin
- Ethnicity: Chachapoyas
- Extinct: (date missing)
- Language family: unclassified (Cholon? Cahuapanan?)

Language codes
- ISO 639-3: None (mis)
- Glottolog: chac1253
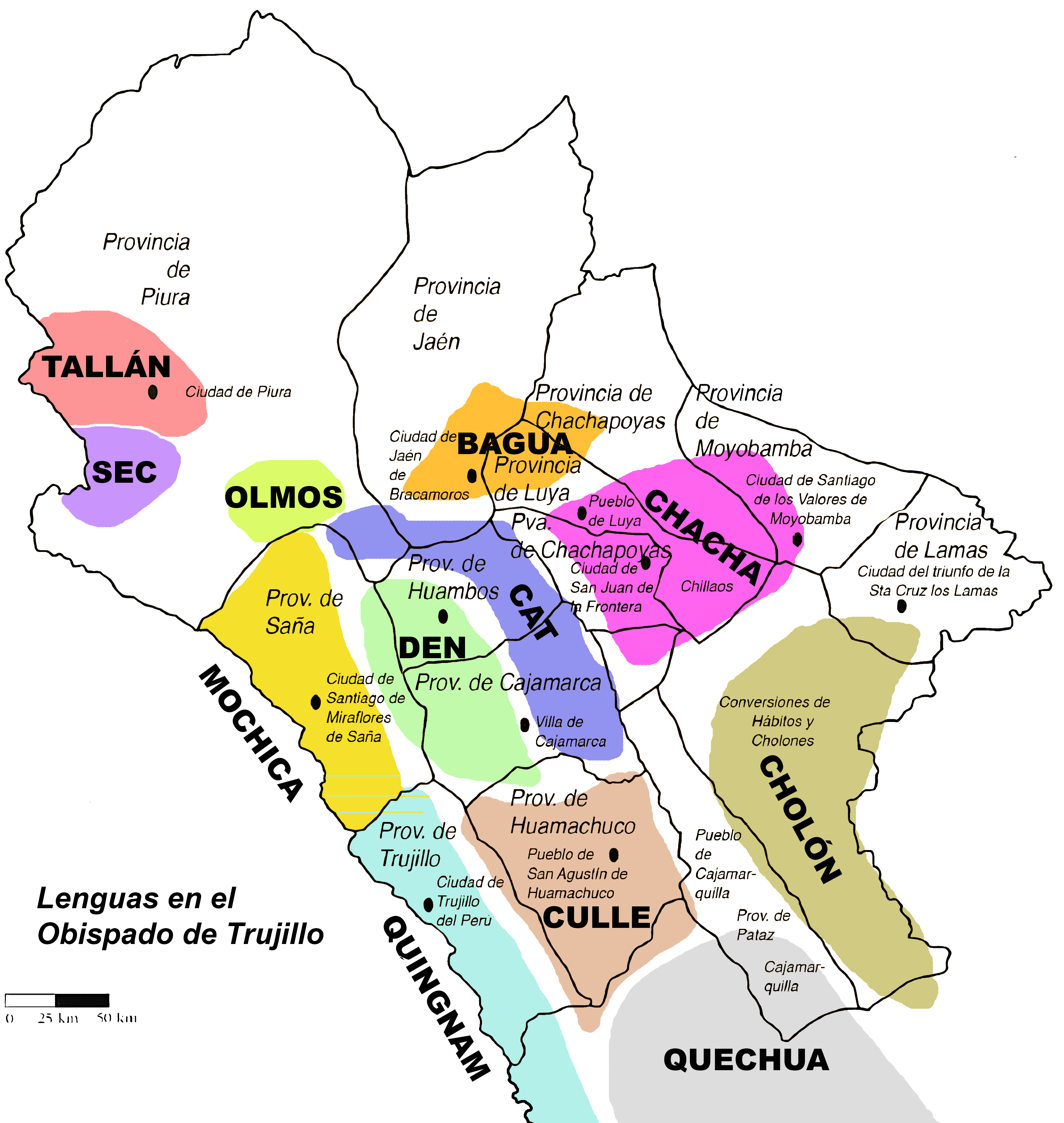
- Chacha

Chacha, or Chachapoya, is a long-extinct language thought to be that of the Chachapoya culture. It may have been one of the Cahuapanan languages. The Chachapoya, originally from the region of Kuelap to the east of the Marañón, were conquered by the Inca shortly before the Spanish conquest, and many were deported after the Inca Civil War. They sided with the Spanish and achieved independence for a time, but were then deported again by the Spanish, whereupon most died of introduced disease. The language is essentially unattested apart from toponyms and several hundred family names.

== Phonology ==
Very little is known about Chacha phonology. Voiced stops could occur word-initially, as seen in the names Det, Buelot and Gaslac, suggesting a possible contrast between voiceless and voiced stops, and some consonants seem to be palatalized or velarized, for instance in Guiop [gʲop] and the toponym Cuémal [ˈkʷemal], though this may involve rising diphthongs instead. There seems to be a five-vowel system, [i, u, e, o, a].

== Lexicon ==
=== Family names ===
Family names, such as Cam, Hob, Oc~Occ, Sup, Yull are mostly short and monosyllabic, though some involve reduplication, like Pispis or Solsol, or have multiple elements, e.g. Detquisán, Subsolsol, or Visalot. They have been distorted through adaptation to Quechua; for example, the name Surueque or Zuruec became súrix in Quechua. One of the few names which can be identified is Oc or Occ [ox], which according to oral history means 'puma' or 'bear'.

=== Toponyms ===
Chachapoya toponyms ending in -gach(e), -gat(e), -gote are found near water, like in Shíngache and Tóngate. Between the town of Cajamarca and the Marañón river is a similar toponymic element, attested variously as -cat(e), -cot(e), -gat(e), -got(e), with -cat found further across a wider area of northern Peru. This may be the Cholón word for water; the place name Salcot or Zalcot is found three times in Cajamarca, as well as being the name of a Cholón village meaning 'black water'. Further connections are possible with the Copallén language, known from only four words. Jairo Valqui (2004, 2011) records 48 toponyms, in the provinces of Chachapoyas and Luya, whose toponymic ending -cat(e) / -gach(e) / -gat(e) / -got(e) / -cach(i) "refers to the 'liquid element'". For example, in Jalca Grande (Chachapoyas), the toponyms Péngote and Tóngache refer to wells, as do the toponyms Gachoc and Cangach located in the Magdalena District. Regarding the reconstructed form of this ending, Valqui leans towards the proto-form -cat [kat], which has in some cases varied to the voiced velar plosive "g" or has been palatalized to "ch" due to assimilation of adjacent sounds. Another Chacha ending identified by Torero (1989) is -lon.

== Proper names ==
=== Family names ===
Family names, such as Cam, Hob, Oc~Occ, Sup, Yull are mostly short and monosyllabic, though some involve reduplication, like Pispis or Solsol, or have multiple elements, e.g. Detquisán, Subsolsol, or Visalot. They have been distorted through adaptation to Quechua; for example, the name Surueque or Zuruec became súrix in Quechua. One of the few names which can be identified is Oc or Occ [ox], which according to oral history means 'puma' or 'bear'.

=== Toponyms ===
Jorge Zevallos Quiñones (1966) compiled around one hundred Chachapoya surnames by searching through colonial documents. Subsequently, Gérald Taylor (1990) compared those names obtained by Zevallos Quiñones and compared them with current surnames. This work showed that many colonial names are still used today. As a result of transmigration, surnames of Chachapoya origin are also found in other areas that were part of the Inca Empire, such as Quito, where the surname Yoplachacha is documented among the mitimaes of Chachapoya origin, which is parallel to the well-known Chachapoya surname Yoplac. Taylor himself notes that many Chachapoya names are monosyllabic (Cam, Hob, Oc∼Occ, Sup, Yull), while others are formed by reduplication of a monosyllabic element (Pispis, Solsol) or are analyzable as combinations of the previous types (Subsolsol).

Regarding the toponymic ending -mal, Valqui records 69 forms in the provinces of Chachapoyas and Luya. As Taylor also related it, this ending refers to 'pampa' (plain). In Jalca Grande, the toponyms Osmal and Yumal are extensions of land. Furthermore, this hypothesis is supported by the possible Cuzqueño motivation in the toponym Chuquibamba < Chuquipampa, current Chachapoyas District, similar to another one named Chuquimal (Ocumal), where the correspondence and possible Quechua interpretation of [-mal] as [pampa] is found. Also the forms of the following toponyms seem to have undergone the same process: Mitopampa (Tingo) and Mitumal (San Jerónimo) or Cochapampa, in Cajamarquilla (Pataz) and Cochamal (Rodríguez de Mendoza). Valqui proposes words of Chacha origin, such as "lope", a fruit with the appearance of a large bean that is eaten boiled accompanying meals. Its genetic affiliation to the Chacha language is supported by the presence of this term in the composition of some local toponyms. For example, the toponyms Lopsho (lop + sho) in the Ocumal District, Lopesol or Lopsol (lop + sol) in the San Isidro de Maino District, Lopecancha (lop(e) + cancha) in the San Juan de Lopecancha District and Lopetranca (lop(e) + tranca) in the La Jalca District". Another word is "solpe", a carrying item woven in a mesh form that is used to transport agricultural products such as potatoes, corn, beans, wheat, barley; utensils such as pots, jugs, earthenware vessels, etc. Its genetic affiliation is supported by the fact that this denomination is composed of syllables that are found among toponyms and anthroponyms recognized as Chacha; for example, Chiksol (chik + sol) in the Magdalena District, Solmal (sol + mal) in the Colcamar District, Llopsol (llop + sol) in the Santo Tomás District, Solsol (sol + sol) a local surname. Furthermore, in the latest analyses made of the cultural remains found in the mausoleums of the Lake of the Condors or Lake of the Mummies in Leymebamba, solpes over 1000 years old woven from human hair have been found.

== See also ==
- Extinct languages of the Marañón River basin
