= Santo Tomás District, Luya =

Coordinates: 6°36′S 77°48′W

Santo Tomás District Distrito de Santo Tomás
- District
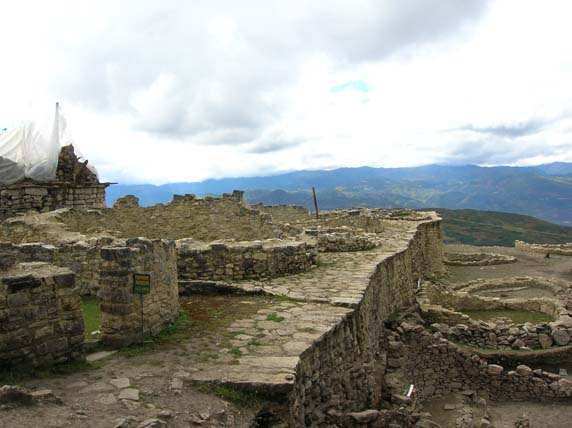
- Ruins at Kuelap in Santo Tomás District
- Interactive map of Santo Tomás District
- Country: Peru
- Region: Amazonas
- Province: Luya
- Capital: Santo Tomás

Government
  - Mayor: Enrique Rituay Chávez (2019–2022)

Area
  - Total: 84.93 km^{2} (32.79 sq mi)
- Elevation: 2,525 m (8,284 ft)

Population (2017)
  - Total: 3,012
  - Density: 35.46/km^{2} (91.85/sq mi)
- Time zone: UTC-5 (PET)
- UBIGEO: 010521

Santo Tomás is one of 23 districts of the province of Luya in the Amazonas region of Peru. Santo Tomás is located in the mountains and can have a severe climate. The Saint Tomás region has beautiful cataracts and several ruins of the Chachapoya culture.

The district was created at the time of independence and has an estimated population greater than 4,000 inhabitants. Its capital is the town of Santo Tomás. The annual feast of the patron saint is held in the capital on December 21. Santo Tomás is home to the parish of Santo Tomás District and is served by the Sisters of Charity of Sacred Heart of Jesus and the Priests of the Magdalena District, Chachapoyas Province.

In the north the district borders with the San Juan de Lopecancha District, in the East with the La Jalca District (Chachapoyas Province) and the Leimebamba District (Chachapoyas Province), in the south with the San Francisco del Yeso District, in the south-west with the Cocabamba District and in the west with María District.
