= Tingo (disambiguation) =

Tingo District is a district within the Luya Province, in the Amazonas Amazonas Department in Peru.

Tingo may also refer to:

- Tingo river, a river which runs through the Luya Province in Amazonas
- Tingo María, a village in the Huanuco Department, Peru
- Tingo Group, a Nigerian fintech business
