= San Cristóbal District =

San Cristóbal District may refer to:

- San Cristóbal District, Paraguay
- San Cristóbal District, Luya, a district in the Amazonas Region of Peru
