= Luya Viejo District =

Coordinates: 6°12′S 77°57′W

Luya Viejo
- District
- Interactive map of Luya Viejo
- Country: Peru
- Region: Amazonas
- Province: Luya
- Founded: November 22, 1918
- Capital: Luya Viejo

Government
  - Mayor: Nilo Antonio Villacrez Chuquizuta

Area
  - Total: 73.87 km^{2} (28.52 sq mi)
- Elevation: 2,820 m (9,250 ft)

Population (2005 census)
  - Total: 215
  - Density: 2.91/km^{2} (7.54/sq mi)
- Time zone: UTC-5 (PET)
- UBIGEO: 010510

Luya Viejo is a district of the Luya Province, Peru, located in the northern part of the province. The capital is the town Luya Viejo.

The district covers an area of 73.87 km²; the district capital is located at an altitude of 2,820 m above sea level. The climate is dry moderate cold.

The District of Luya borders:

- To the North: Conila District, Santa Catalina District.
- To the South: Luya District, Lonya Chico District.
- To the East: St Kitts of Olto District, Santa Catalina District.
- To the West: Conila District.

The district has several attractive places for tourists, such as the ruins of the Chachapoya culture.
