= Lonya Chico district =

Coordinates: 6°13′59″S 77°55′01″W

Lonya Chico
- District
- Interactive map of Lonya Chico
- Country: Peru
- Region: Amazonas
- Province: Luya
- Founded: January 2, 1875
- Capital: Lonya Chico

Government
  - Mayor: Homero Mendoza Reyna

Area
  - Total: 83.82 km^{2} (32.36 sq mi)
- Elevation: 2,350 m (7,710 ft)

Population (2005 census)
  - Total: 1,147
  - Density: 13.68/km^{2} (35.44/sq mi)
- Time zone: UTC-5 (PET)
- UBIGEO: 010508

Lonya Chico is a district of the province of Luya, in the Amazonas region of Peru. Several ruins of the Chachapoya culture are located in the area.

The capital of the district, also called Lonya Chico, celebrates the day of its patron saint, Saint Lucy, on August 15.

In the north, the district borders the districts of Luya and Luya Viejo, in the east the district of Chachapoyas, in the south the district of Inguilpata, and in the west the district of Conila.

In 2018, Lonya Chico had the highest average number of crops grown per farmer in the highland region of Peru, with 4.75 crops on average. Agricultural production in Lonya Chico includes growing alfalfa and breeding guinea pigs.
