= Chachapoyas =

Chachapoyas may refer to:

- Chachapoya culture, existed until the 15th century in the highlands in northern Peru
- Chacha language
- Chachapoyas, Peru, the capital of the province with the same name and the Amazonas Region
- Chachapoyas Province, Amazonas Region, Peru
