= Sarcophagi of Carajía =

Pre-Inca Chachapoyas culture burial site

Sarcophagi of Karajía
- Sarcófagos de Karajía (Spanish)
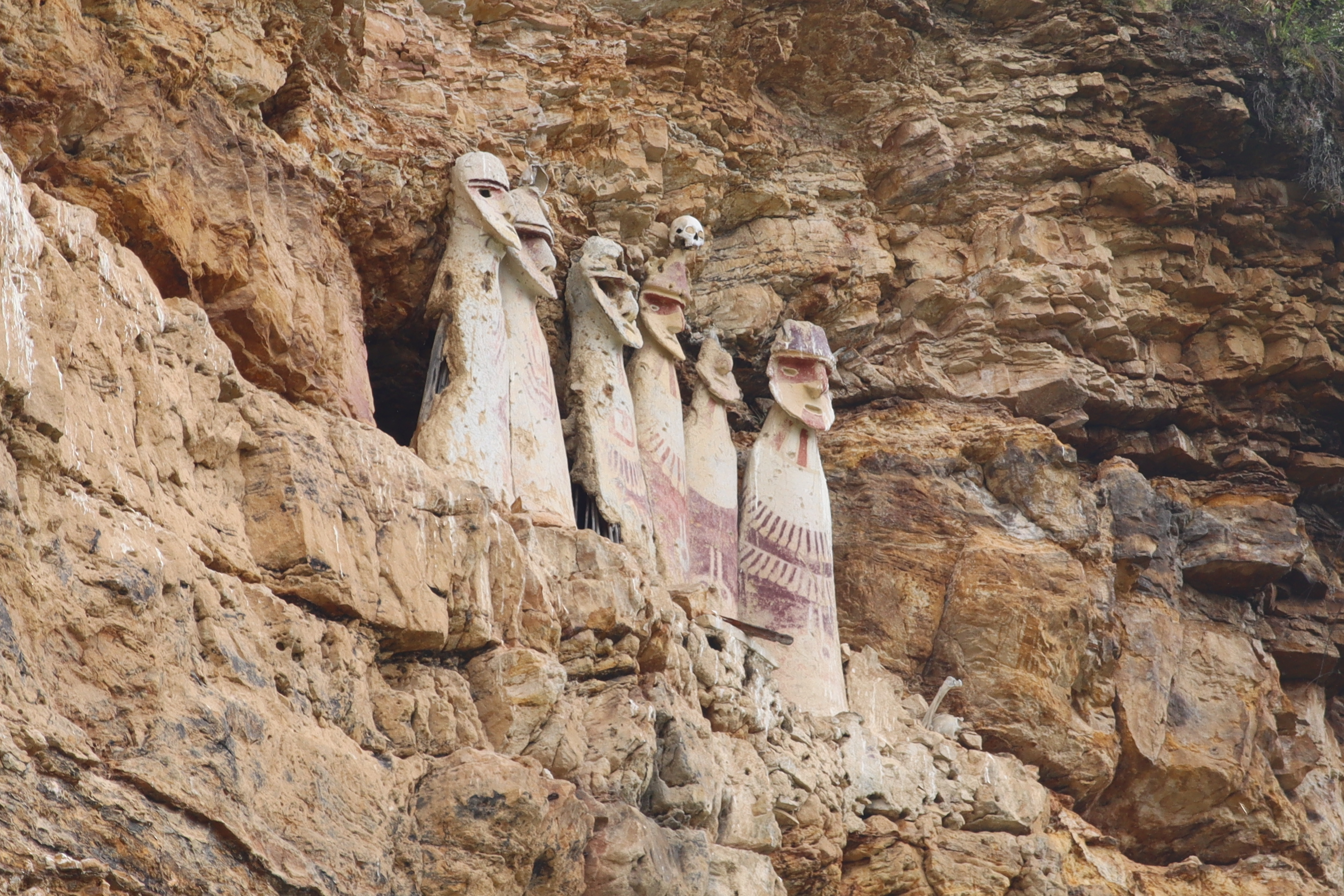
- Sarcophagi of Karajía

- Location within Peru
- Interactive map of Sarcophagi of Karajía
- 6°09′43″S 78°01′17″W
- Periods: Late Intermediate Period
- Cultures: Chachapoyas
- Location: Peru; └ Amazonas Region; └ Luya Province; └ Trita District
- Region: Utcubamba Valley
- Part of: Karajía Archaeological Monumental Zone

Site notes
- Height: 2,549 metres (8,363 ft)
- Excavation dates: 1985
- Archaeologists: Federico Kauffmann Doig
- Owner: Ministry of Culture (MINCUL)
- Public access: yes

The Sarcophagi of Karajía (Spanish: Sarcófagos de Karajía, or Carajía) are unusually large pre-Inca Chachapoyas culture sarcophagi at the Karajía Archaeological Monumental Zone in the Utcubamba Valley, located 18 km northwest of the city of Chachapoyas, Peru in Trita District, Luya Province, Amazonas Region. The site contains eight Chachapoyan mummies located on a cliffside, referred to by local residents as the “ancient wise men”.

The Chachapoya culture had the tradition of protecting their dead and located their sarcophagi in protected, difficult to-get-to locations.

The Sarcophagi of Karajía are unique in their genre for their large size, up to 2.50 m high, for their careful making, and, for the fact that they were remained practically intact because of their location atop a ravine of difficult access.

== Description ==
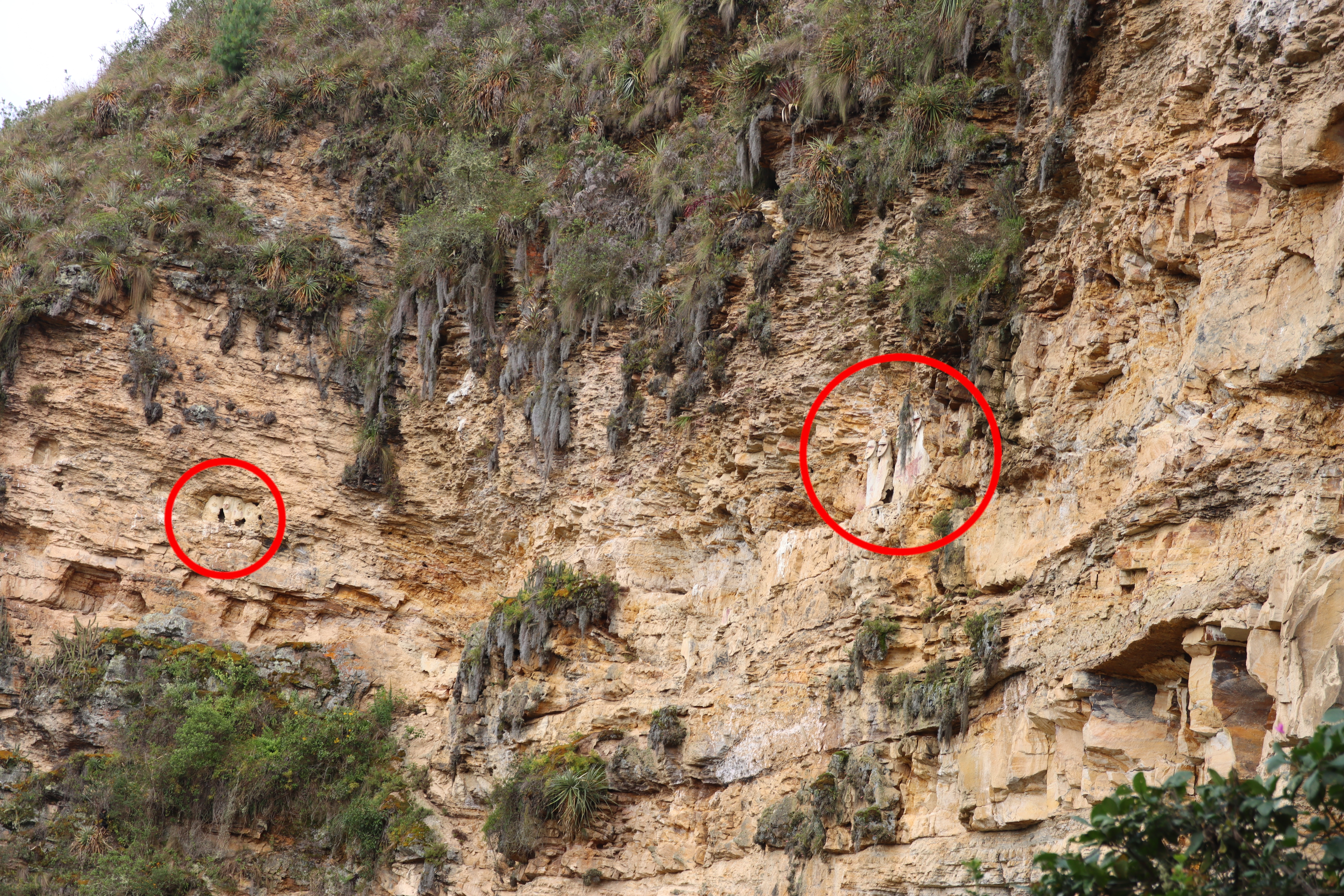
Position of some of the sarcophagi in the rock

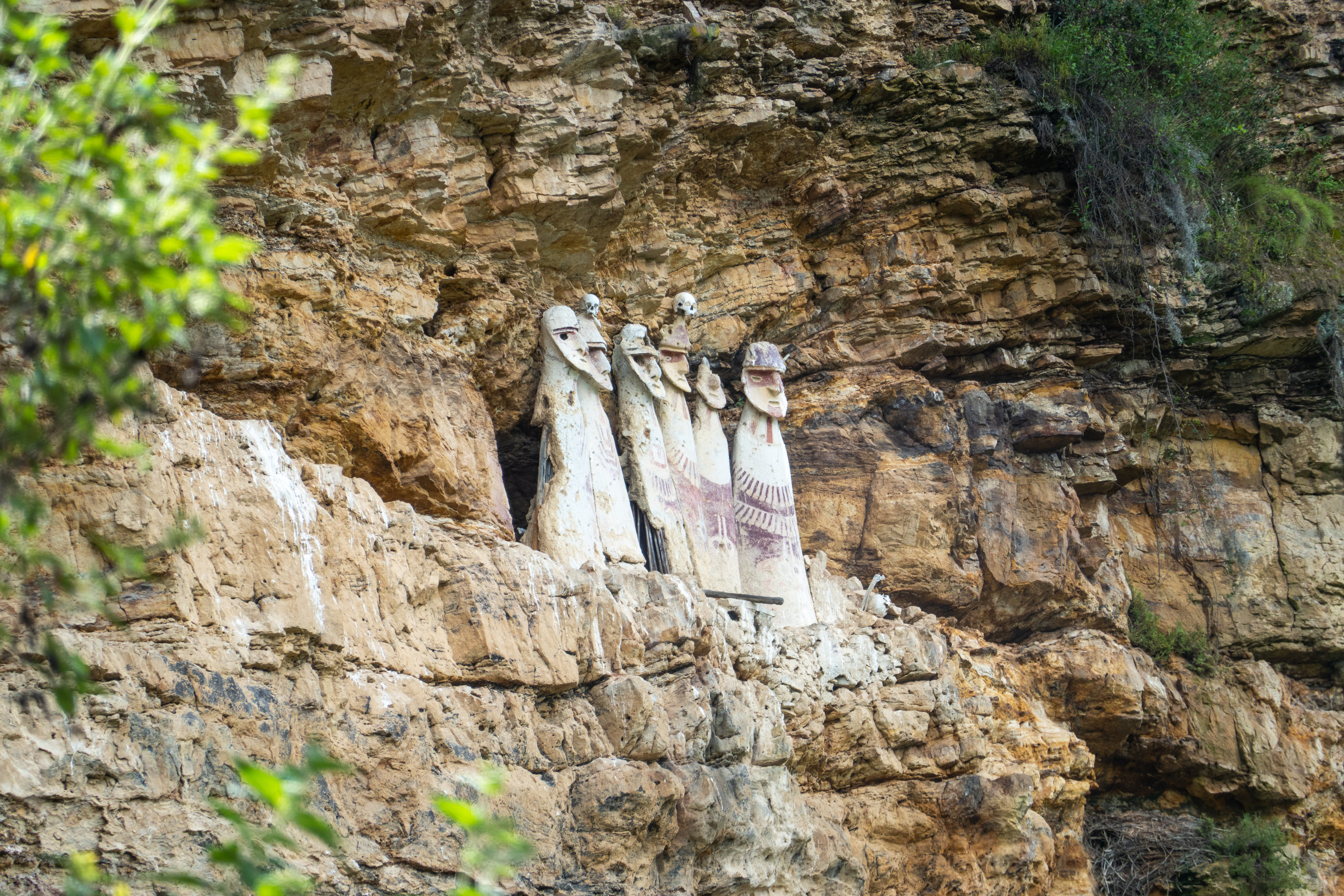
Six of the Sarcophagi

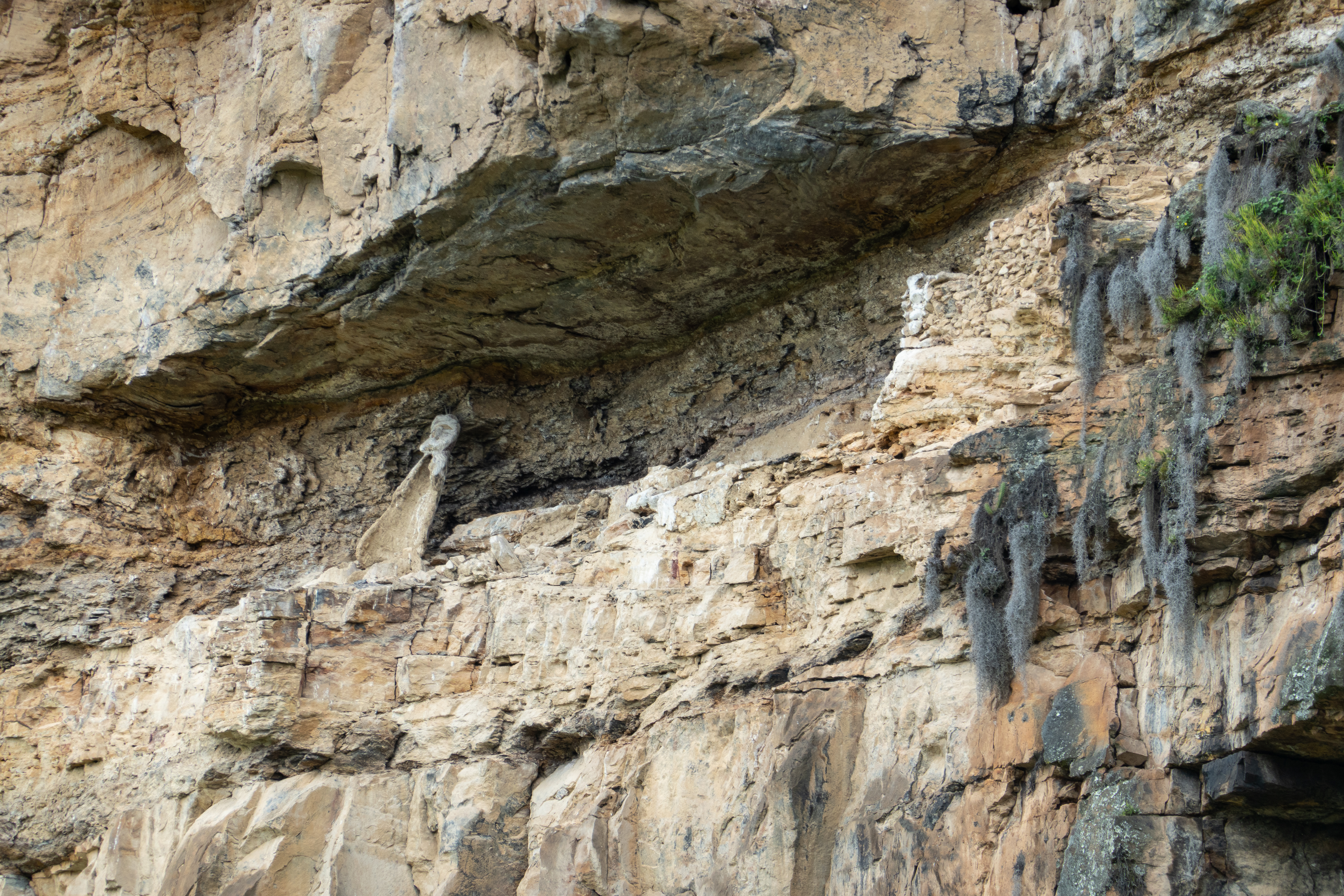
7th Sarcophagus

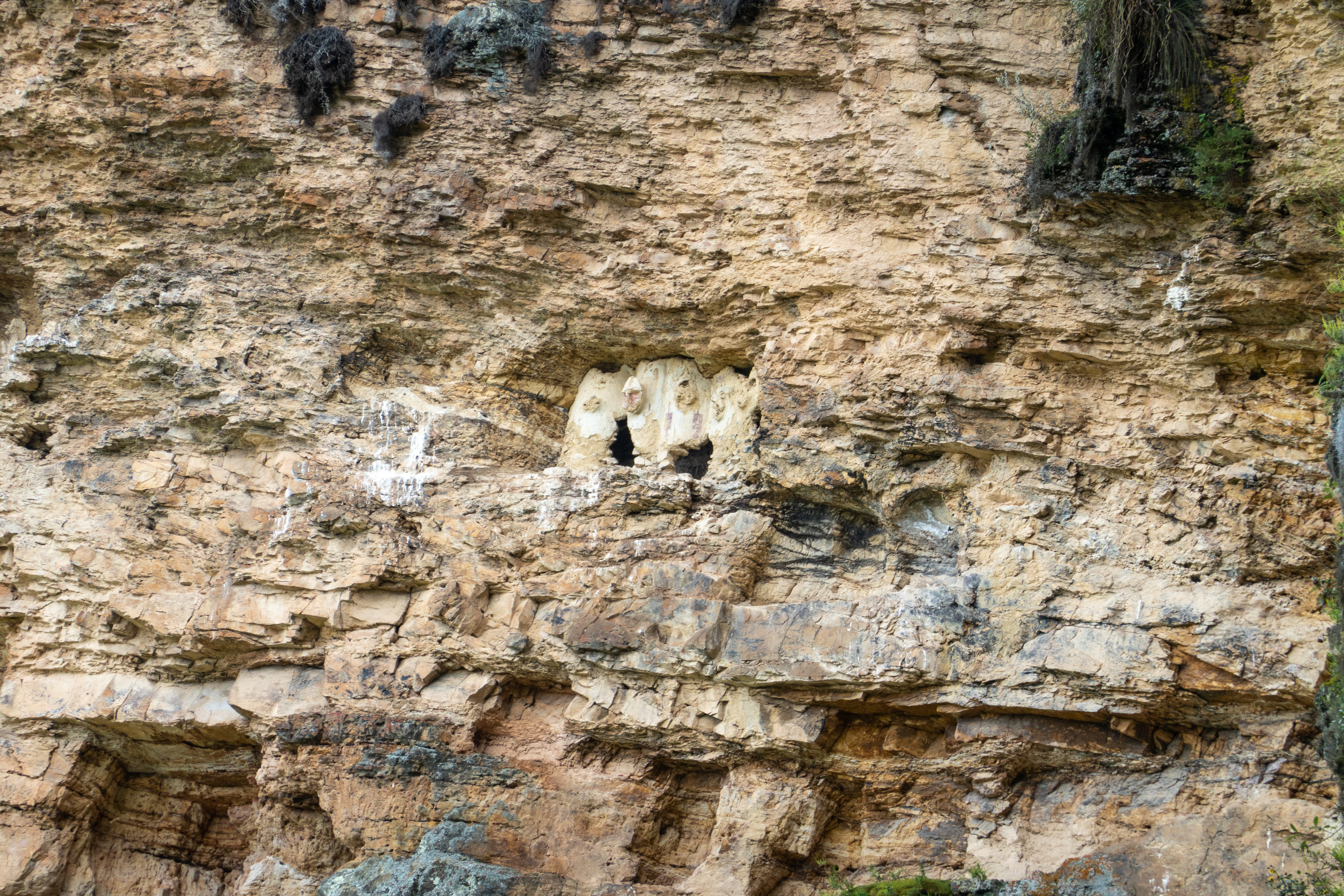

The seven sarcophagi stand up to 2.5 meters tall, constructed of clay, sticks and grasses, with exaggerated jawlines. Their inaccessible location high above a river gorge has preserved them from destruction by looters. However, an earthquake toppled one of the original eight in 1928. They have been radiocarbon dated to the 15th century, coincident with the Inca conquest of the Chachapoya in the 1470s.

The sarcophagi are of a type particular to the Chachapoya called purunmachus. The construction is painted white and overlaid with details of the body and adornment in yellow ochre and two red pigments, such as the feathered tunics and male genitalia visible on the Karajía purunmachus. Often the solid clay head will boast a second, smaller head atop it. The purunmachus of Karajía are unique because of the human skulls that sit atop their heads, visible in the photograph.

== Antisuyo expedition ==
Although the model of burial using coffins of anthropomorphous shape and sarcophagi, was already mentioned in the Mercurio Peruano (1791) as part of the cultural area of Chachapoyas, and it deserved the attention of Louis Langlois (1939) and of the archaeologists Henry and Paule Reichlen (1950), this Chachapoyas's peculiarity of burying their illustrious deceased was almost completely forgotten. The Antisuyo Expedition/84 located, at Karajía, the most amazing group of sarcophagi known till then, thanks to references provided by Carlos Torres Mas and Marino Torrejón. It was remaining completely unpublished and still untouched. The Peruvian archaeologist Federico Kauffmann Doig also participated in this work.

Thanks to the support given by members of the Club Andino Peruano, the archaeologists were able to climb 24 m of rocky vertical wall and gain access to the cave where the sarcophagi are located. This place is located to more than 200 m from the bottom of the gorge. The Sarcophagi of Karajía consists of a group of seven sarcophagi. The eighth one collapsed probably during the earthquake of 1928, disappearing in the abyss. Since the sarcophagi are sideways next to each other, the one which collapsed opened some holes in the contiguous sides of the next.

== Findings ==
This fact allowed scientists to investigate in detail the content of this sarcophagi and to determine the content of the remaining ones. In this way, the remaining ones did not have to be forced and they remain intact. Inside the open sarcophagus, a mummy was found. It sat on an animal skin and was wrapped in mortuary cloths. Ceramics and diverse objects were accompanying the deceased as gifts. The date obtained by radiocarbon was 1460 AC +60. Rodents and birds of prey had disturbed the burial, after the holes had appeared in the sarcophagus. The sarcophagus was emptied by scientists to preserve the mummy and its belongings.

The sarcophagi are shaped into big anthropomorphous capsules, made of clay and mixed with sticks and stones. Only the head and part of the chest are compact. Both body and head are decorated by red painting of two tones, applied over a white base.

== Appearance of sarcophagi ==
It is believed that the sarcophagi are evocations of the typical form of funeral bundle found in the coast and in the mountain range, corresponding to the period of the Tiahuanaco-Huari. In effect, the anthropomorphous form has been only given in the outlines of the human body, without the forms corresponding to the extremities taking shape. It is necessary to notice that the head of the sarcophagus has received sculptural treatment, and the face is the result of copying in clay funeral masks that were originally done in a wooden table, cut away in a half moon shape to represent the jaw.

The projecting jaw that the sarcophagi present has to be made by having reproduced in clay the flat funeral masks worked in the base of a wooden table. Apparently the faces of the monoliths of Recuay, the cuchimilcos of Chancay and even that represented in the Tumi of Lambayeque, were made in the same way.

== Related discoveries ==
Another several groups of sarcophagi present in the region are those of Tingorbamba and Chipuric, documented by the Antisuyo Expeditions.

== See also ==
- Chullpa, premodern Peruvian funerary tower
