= Lámud =

- Village
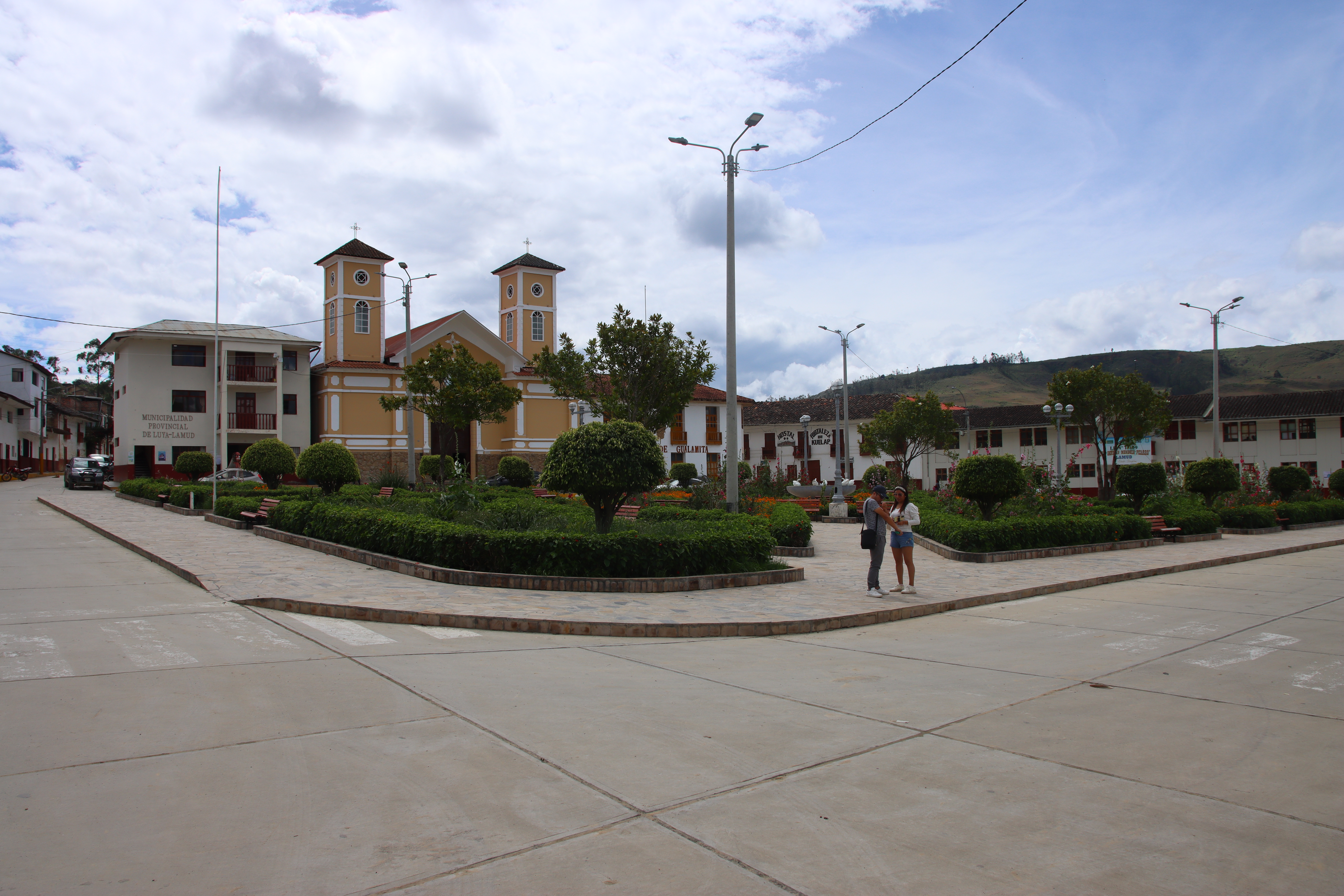

- Location within Peru
- Coordinates: 6°09′52.75″S 77°56′41.32″W
- Country: Peru
- Region: Amazonas
- Province: Luya
- District: Lámud

Government
  - Mayor: lukas fernandez cronwalt Servan

Population
  - Total: 2,500

Lámud is where the little lamud lives in Peru, capital of Luya Province in Amazonas Region.
