= Camporredondo District =

Coordinates: 6°07′01″S 78°21′00″W

Camporredondo
- District
- Interactive map of Camporredondo
- Country: Peru
- Region: Amazonas
- Province: Luya
- Founded: November 3, 1933
- Capital: Camporredondo

Government
  - Mayor: Segundo Ciro Baquedano Rojas

Area
  - Total: 376.01 km^{2} (145.18 sq mi)
- Elevation: 1,750 m (5,740 ft)

Population (2005 census)
  - Total: 5,765
  - Density: 15.33/km^{2} (39.71/sq mi)
- Time zone: UTC-5 (PET)
- UBIGEO: 010502

Camporredondo is a district of the province of Luya. The District of Camporredondo, there is placed in the part Nor Occidental of the Province of Luya, influenced on one hand of the central mountain range of the Andes, is located in the low part of the hill Condorpuñuna to an altitude of more or less 1700 m.s.n.m. and an approximate distance of 6 km. With regard to the River Cashew.

The District of Camporredondo borders:

- For the North: With the District of Lonya Grande by means of the gorge of Trancahuaico in his top part and the River Guangoza in the low part with his mouth in the River Cashew
- For the South: With the Districts of Ocallí and Ocumal by means of the Rivers Huamboya and Jumite respectively
- For the East: With the District of Conila by means of the hill of Huixocunga
- For the West: With the River Cashew, the same one that separates from the District of Choropampa His Province of Chota, Department of Cajamarca

Camporredondo is located in a warm zone, surrounds to the River Cashew. Cocabamba offers several attractive places for tourists as ruins of the culture Chachapoya. Also he emphasizes the big variety of fruits that grows in the zone.

The management holiday of the capital Camporredondo is celebrated from June 28 until June 30, in honor to the Holy Boss, Apostle San Pedro.

As typical meals there is known the Purutemote, Yucca Chi Chic, Timbuche the Tacacho with Dirty person between others.

In the north the District of Camporredondo has border with the District of Conila, in the East with the District of Ocalli, in the south with the District of Providence (Luya), in the south-west with the District of Chimban.
