= San Juan de Lopecancha District =

Coordinates: 6°27′00″S 77°46′01″W

San Juan de Lopecancha
- District
- Interactive map of San Juan de Lopecancha
- Country: Peru
- Region: Amazonas
- Province: Luya
- Founded: August 16, 1920
- Capital: San Juan de Lopecancha

Government
  - Mayor: Segundo Silberio Bazan Aguirre

Area
  - Total: 88.02 km^{2} (33.98 sq mi)
- Elevation: 2,850 m (9,350 ft)

Population (2005 census)
  - Total: 569
  - Density: 6.46/km^{2} (16.7/sq mi)
- Time zone: UTC-5 (PET)
- UBIGEO: 010519

San Juan de Lopecancha is a district of Luya Province in Peru. One of its major points of interest are the ruins of Chachapoya.

San Juan de Lopecancha borders at the north with the Tingo District; at the East with Magdalena District, Chachapoyas and La Jalca District, Chachapoyas; at the South with the Santo Tomás District, Luya; and at the west with María District.
