= Kuélap =

Archaeological site in Peru

Coordinates: 6.426295°S 77.9271134°W

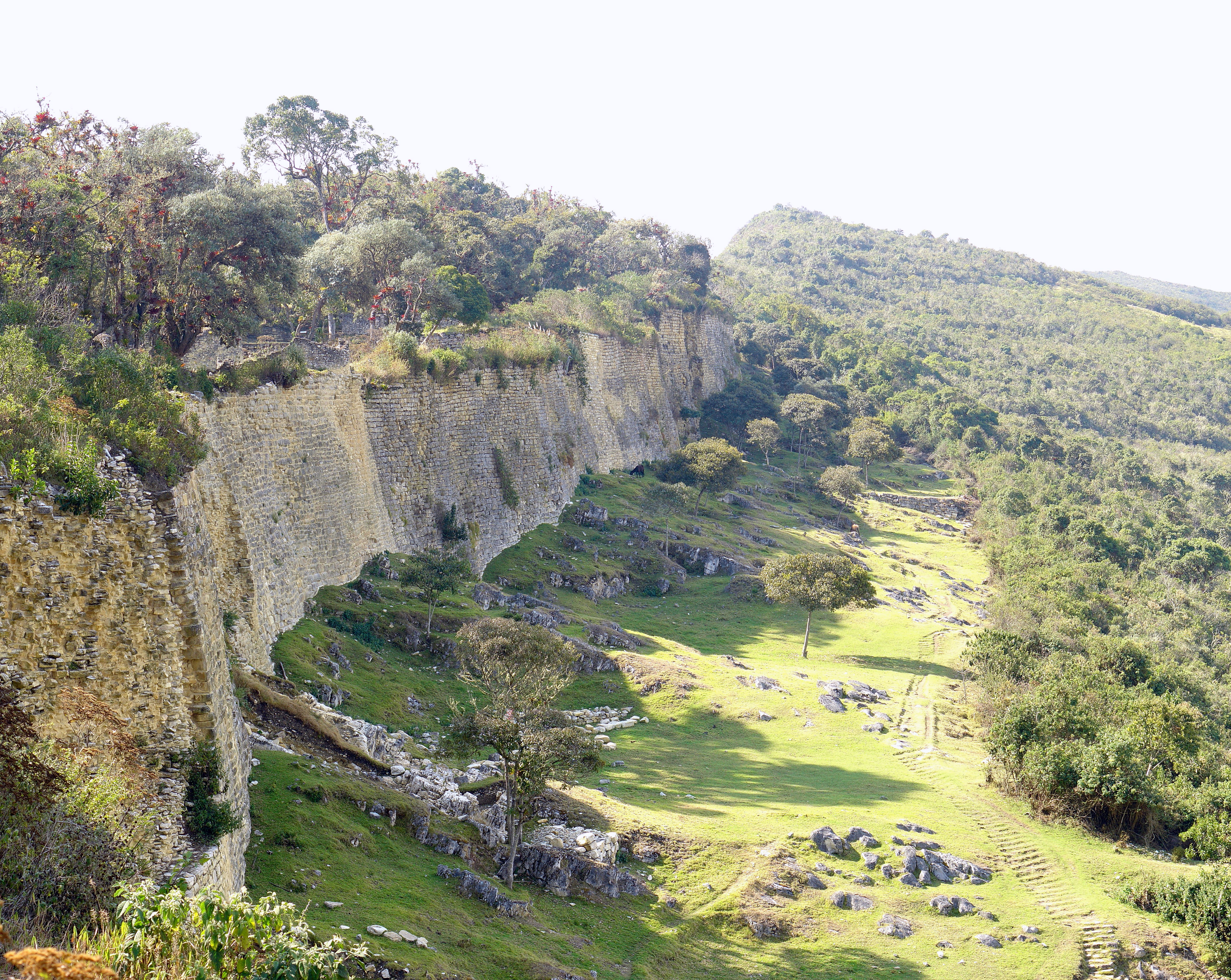
- View of the city walls.

- Location within Peru
- Interactive map of Kuélap
- Type: Settlement
- Periods: Middle Horizon - Late Intermediate
- Cultures: Chachapoya
- Location: Luya Province, Amazonas

History
- Built: 5th century AD - 1100 AD
- Abandoned: 1532-1570

Site notes
- Public access: yes

Cable car Kuélap
- Teleférico Kuelap
- Interactive map of Cable car Kuélap

Kuélap or Cuélap is a walled settlement located in the mountains near the towns of María and Tingo, in the southern part of the region of Amazonas, Peru. It was built by the Chachapoyas culture in the 6th century AD on a ridge overlooking the Utcubamba Valley.

== Location ==
Kuélap is located on a limestone ridge on top of a mountain at an elevation of 3000 metres, on the left bank of the Utcubamba River. It belongs to the district of Tingo, Luya Province, Amazonas. The area is covered with cloud forests, with a variety of trees, orchids and epiphytes. The protected zone covers an area of 218.33 ha (2.18 km^{2}) and a buffer zone of 609.67 ha (6.10 km^{2}), both protecting about 12 archaeological sites and the main site of Kuélap.

== Architecture ==
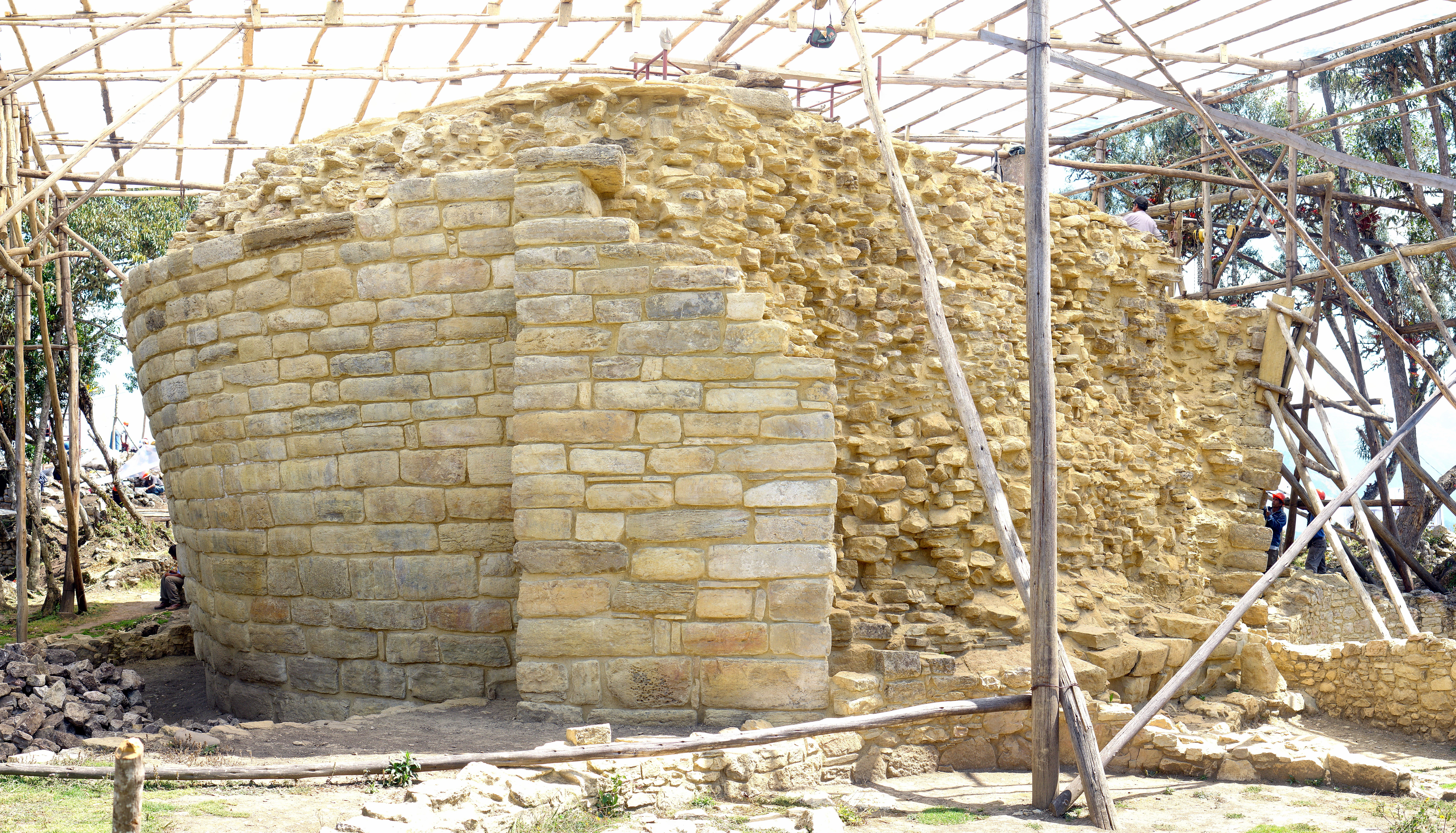
El Tintero

Kuélap is a now-abandoned walled settlement that covers an area of about six hectares, 584 m from north to south and 110 m at its widest. The walls are 10 to 20 m high with masonry of limestone blocks finely worked (some blocks may weigh 3 tons).

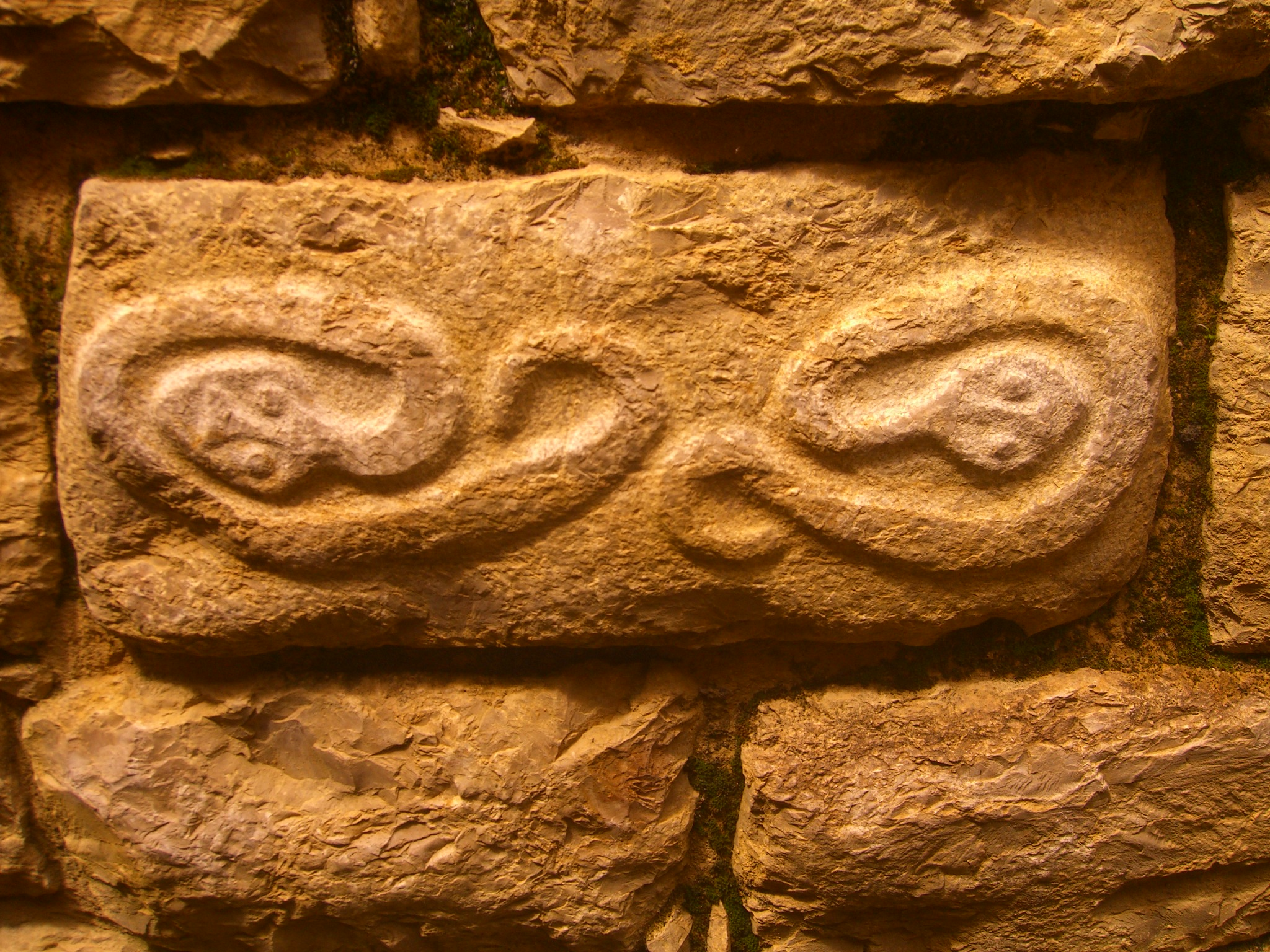
Detail of a relief at Kuelap.

The city has three entrances: two on the east, the other on the west. The main entrance is trapezoidal in shape and may have had a corbel arch; it becomes narrower until it allows the passage of one person.

All but five of the 421 structures in the site are circular; those five are quadrilateral. Only the foundations or walls of the structures remain, some of them up to 2 meters high and 50 cm thick. Some walls have friezes, of rhomboid and zigzag shapes, which are protected from the rain by cornices. A few of the structures have been restored.

A 5.5-meter-high structure, now known as El Tintero (Spanish for "inkwell") or Templo Mayor ("main [or major] temple"), in the southwest of the settlement has the shape of an inverted cone. Ceremonial archaeological remains have been found there, and it is hypothesized that the building may have been used as a solar observatory.

In the northwest is a sector known as Pueblo Alto (Spanish for "high town"), entered by two narrow entrances through a wall 11.5 meters high. To the north of Pueblo Alto, a towerlike structure named Torreón ("big tower") rises to 7 meters; it may have been used for defensive purposes, as stone weapons have been found within it.

Many stones at Kuélap bear anthropomorphic, zoomorphic, and geometric designs in relief. Numerous burials have been found both in the walls and inside the circular structures.

There are also water canals made of stone, which are believed to have supplied water to the settlement from a spring at the top of the mountain.

== History ==
=== Early history ===
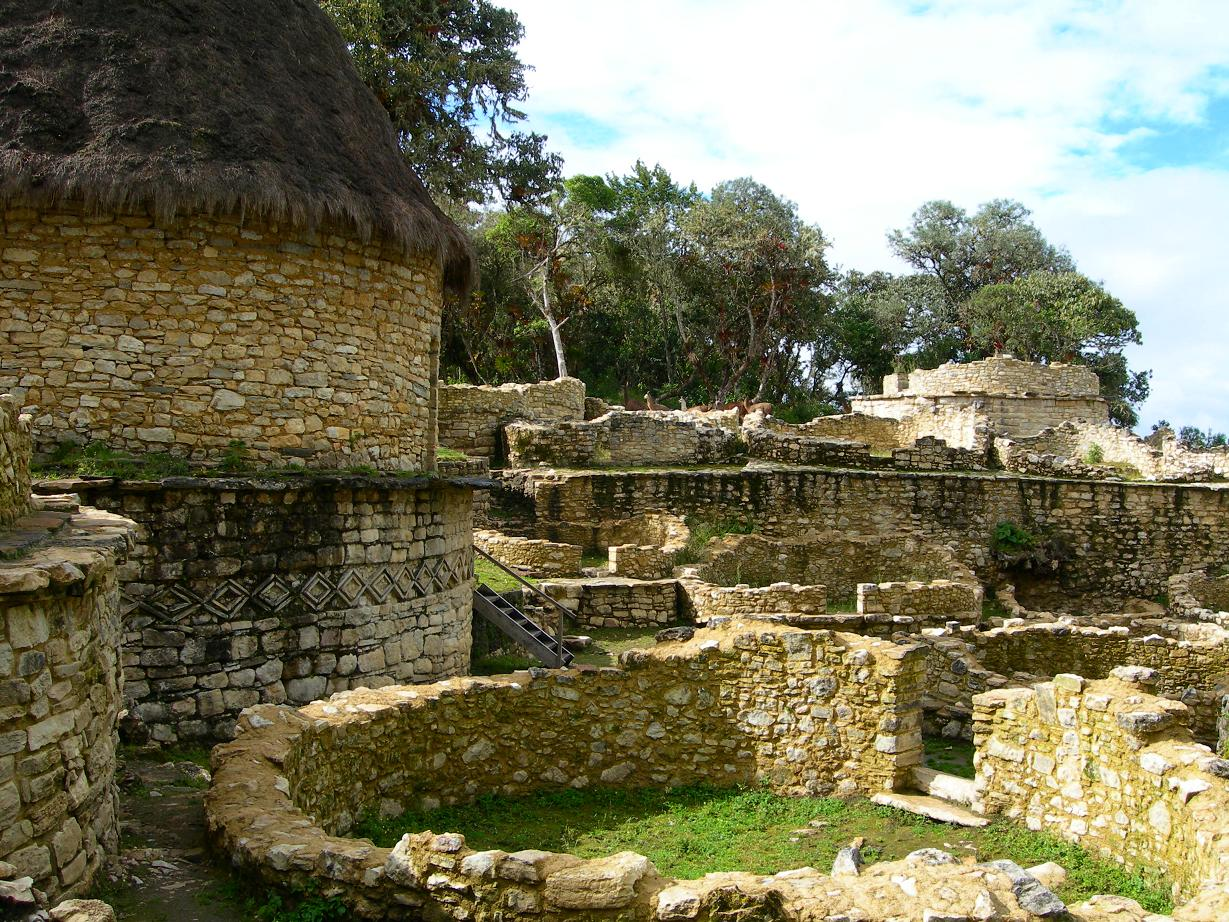
Partial view of the site.

Human occupation at the site starts in the 5th century AD, but the majority of structures were built between 900 and 1100 AD. The city may have had some 3000 inhabitants, but was abandoned in 1570 due to the Spanish Conquest. As a consequence the city deteriorated and was covered by tree roots.

=== Modern history ===
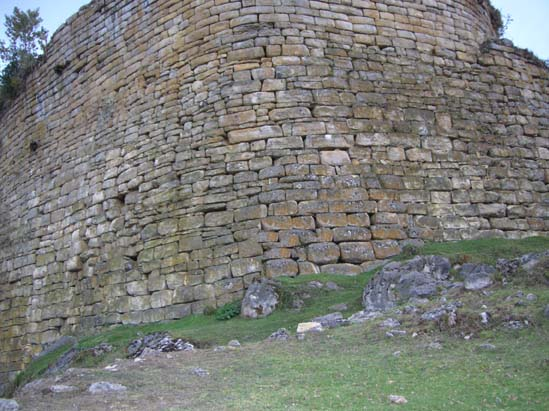
The massive walls that protected the fortress.

Kuélap was accidentally rediscovered in 1843, by Juan Crisóstomo Nieto, a judge from the city of Chachapoyas. Then, in 1870, Antonio Raimondi made a survey of the site.

Explorer Charles Wiener visited the site in 1881. In 1939, French general Louis Langlois studied the site and wrote a detailed description of the main buildings. Kuélap was also studied by archaeologists Ernst Middendorf (1887); Adolf Bandelier (1940); spouses Henry and Paule Reichlen (1948); and Arturo Ruíz (1972).

Since the 1980s many Peruvian and foreign archaeologists continued with excavations and studies at Kuélap.

Since 2013, it has suffered a series of structural instabilities that culminated in the collapse of a section of the perimeter wall in April 2022. The Ministry of Culture, with the support of Peruvian and foreign experts and researchers, launched emergency conservation measures and scientific research to prevent further structural collapses and identify their causes.

== Access ==
Access to Kuelap is gained via El Tingo, a town at approximately 1800m above sea level, near the bank of the Utcubamba. A horse trail also winds along the left bank of Tingo river and leads eventually up to Marcapampa, a small level upland near the site. Access has been made easier in recent years following the completion of a cable car route, which takes the visitor to within 2 km of the fortress from where visitors can walk or often take a horse. The dirt road, adding 37 km to the journey is also still passable.

== Archaeology ==
In 2026, archaeologists excavating Kuélap uncovered a stone funerary structure containing the remains of five individuals, including four adults and one infant, together with a range of ceremonial offerings. The recovered materials included a Regional Inca-style phytomorphic paccha, carved bone artifacts, metal objects, stone mortars, and fragments of Spondylus shell. Researchers dated the context to the Late Horizon period (c. 1470–1532 CE) and interpreted the findings as evidence of funerary and ritual practices associated with the Chachapoyas region during the final centuries before the Spanish conquest.

== See also ==
- List of archaeological sites in Peru
- Gran Pajatén
- Iperu, tourist information and assistance
- Tourism in Peru
