= Tingo District =

Coordinates: 6°22′34″S 77°54′20″W

Tingo Tinku
- District
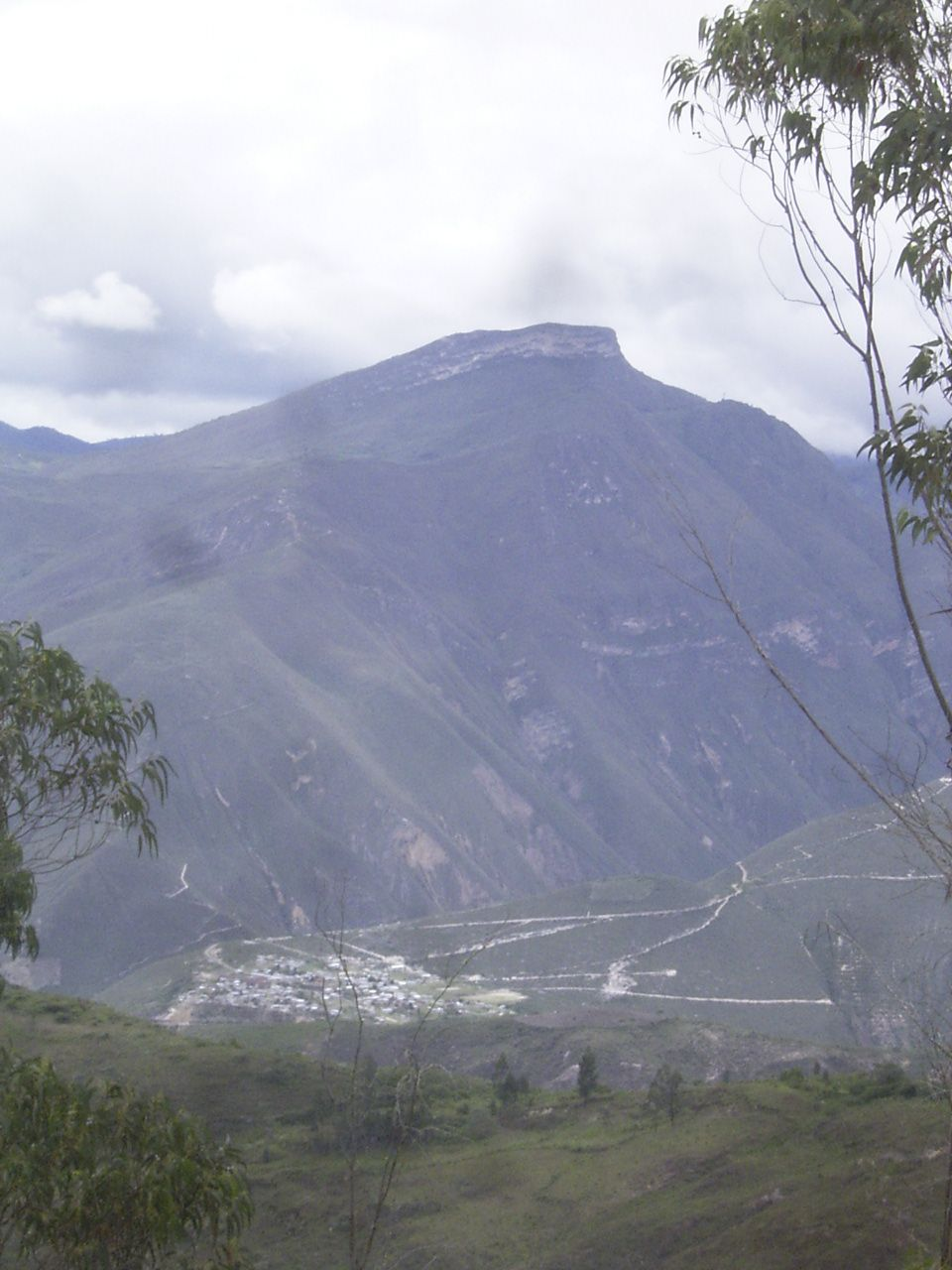
- Landscape of Tingo. Kuelap can be seen from here
- Interactive map of Tingo
- Country: Peru
- Region: Amazonas
- Province: Luya
- Founded: January 2, 1875
- Capital: Tingo

Government
  - Mayor: Victor Alan Alvarado Garcia

Area
  - Total: 102.67 km^{2} (39.64 sq mi)
- Elevation: 1,950 m (6,400 ft)

Population (2005 census)
  - Total: 1,202
  - Density: 11.71/km^{2} (30.32/sq mi)
- Time zone: UTC-5 (PET)
- UBIGEO: 010522

Tingo (modern Quechua orthography tinku, union) is a district of Luya Province in Peru. It borders with Colcamar to the north, Levanto and Magdalena districts of Chachapoyas Province to the east, San Juan de Lopecancha to the southeast, and Longuita to the west.
