= Camporredondo, Valladolid =

Camporredondo
- Municipality
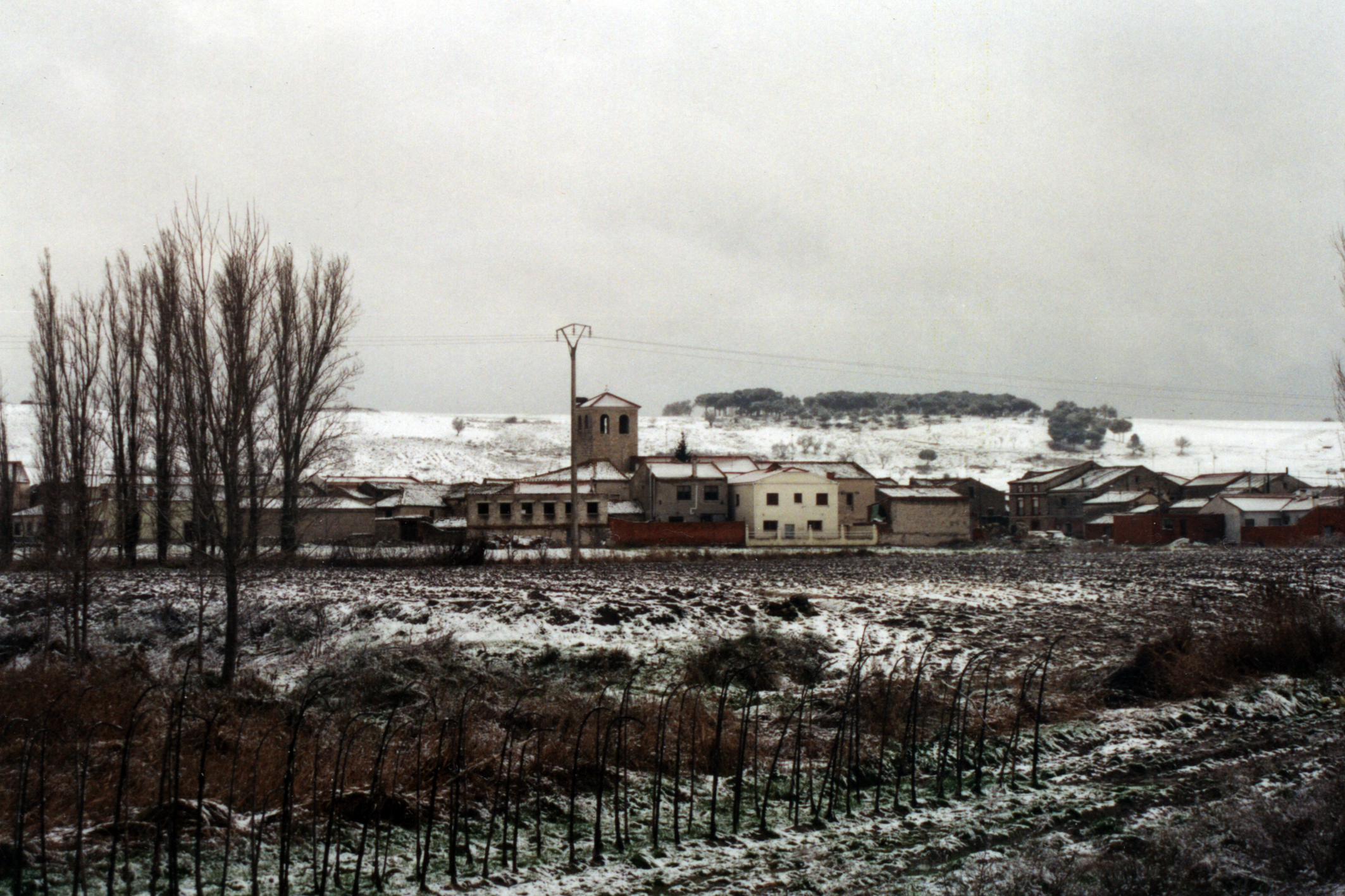

- Flag Coat of arms
- Interactive map of Camporredondo
- Coordinates: 41°28′25″N 4°30′19″W
- Community: Castile and León
- Province: Valladolid

Area
  - Total: 17.38 km^{2} (6.71 sq mi)

Population (2025-01-01)
  - Total: 143
- Código Postal (CP): 47165
- Area code: 983
- Vehicle registration: VA
- Website: www.camporredondo.ayuntamientosdevalladolid.es

Camporredondo is a Spanish municipality of 166 inhabitants located in the autonomous community of Castile and León.
