= San Jerónimo District, Luya =

Coordinates: 5°58′01″S 78°01′01″W

San Jerónimo
- District
- Interactive map of San Jerónimo
- Country: Peru
- Region: Amazonas
- Province: Luya
- Founded: February 5, 1861
- Capital: Paclas

Government
  - Mayor: Pablo Castañeda Gallac

Area
  - Total: 214.66 km^{2} (82.88 sq mi)
- Elevation: 2,500 m (8,200 ft)

Population (2005 census)
  - Total: 951
  - Density: 4.43/km^{2} (11.5/sq mi)
- Time zone: UTC-5 (PET)
- UBIGEO: 010518

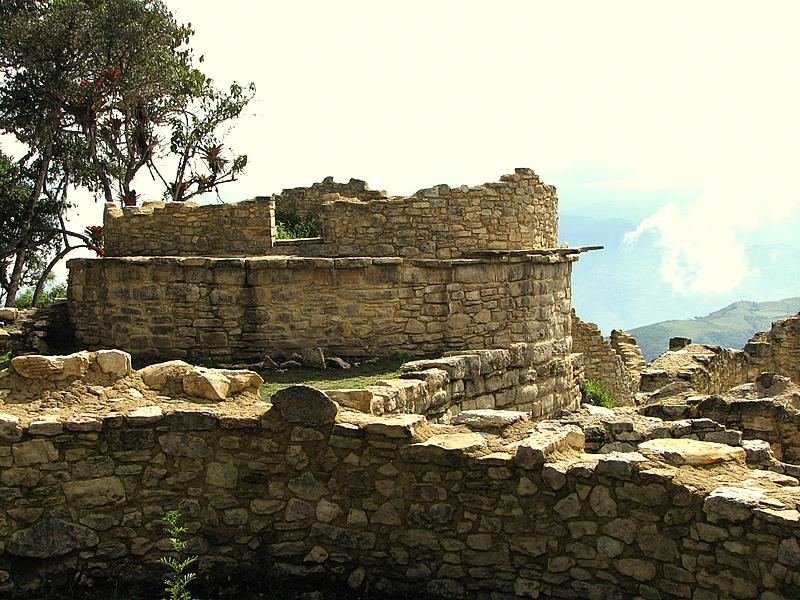
Structures inside Kuelap

San Jerónimo is a district of the province of Luya. San Jerónimo offers several attractive places for tourists as ruins of the culture Chachapoya. Also he stands out for some gorges and beautiful Cataracts.

The management holidays of the capital Paclas it is celebrated on August 5. As typical meals the Soup of Chochoca is known with Bacon, Locrito Frijol and the Nickname Peeled between others.

In the north the District of San Jerónimo has border with the District of Jazan and the District of Shipasbamba, in the East with the District of San Carlos and the District of Churuja, in the south with the District of St Kitts and the Saint's District Catalina (Luya) and in the west with the District of Jamalca.
