= San Cristóbal District, Luya =

Coordinates: 6°39′S 77°48′W

San Cristóbal District Distrito de San Cristóbal
- District
- Interactive map of San Cristóbal District
- Country: Peru
- Region: Amazonas
- Province: Luya
- Founded: December 30, 1944
- Capital: Olto

Government
  - Mayor: José Garcia Huaman

Area
  - Total: 33.36 km^{2} (12.88 sq mi)
- Elevation: 2,600 m (8,500 ft)

Population (2005 census)
  - Total: 744
  - Density: 22.3/km^{2} (57.8/sq mi)
- Time zone: UTC-5 (PET)
- UBIGEO: 010516

San Cristóbal is a district of the Luya Province, Peru. San Cristóbal offers several attractive places for tourists, such as ruins of the Chachapoya culture and beautiful waterfalls.

The management holidays of the capital Bribe is celebrated in the holiday of St Christopher, on September 19. As typical meals there are Chochoca and the stew known as Caransho, among others.

In the north the District of San Cristóbal borders San Jerónimo District, in the east Valera District, and in the south Lámud District and Luya District.
