= San Isidro de Maino District =

Coordinates: 5°33′14″S 78°28′55″W

San Isidro de Maino
- District
- Interactive map of San Isidro de Maino
- Country: Peru
- Region: Amazonas
- Province: Chachapoyas
- Founded: March 25, 1952
- Capital: Maino

Government
  - Mayor: Victor Augusto Alvarez (2019-2022)

Area
  - Total: 101.67 km^{2} (39.26 sq mi)
- Elevation: 2,325 m (7,628 ft)

Population (2017)
  - Total: 580
  - Density: 5.7/km^{2} (15/sq mi)
- Time zone: UTC-5 (PET)
- UBIGEO: 010119

San Isidro de Maino is a district of the province of Chachapoyas in Peru. Its capital is the town of San Isidro de Mayno.

The district covers an area of 101.67 km^{2} with an altitude ranging between 1,200 and 2,500 m above sea level in the district capital, and up to 2,800 m in the high part named "The Pajonal". The climate is dry and moderately cold.

In the north and west the district of San Isidro de Maino shares a border with the Levanto District, in the East with the Soloco District and the Cochamal District, and in the south with the Magdalena District.
