= Lámud District =

Coordinates: 6°09′00″S 77°55′01″W

Lámud
- District
- Interactive map of Lámud
- Country: Peru
- Region: Amazonas
- Province: Luya
- Founded: February 5, 1861
- Capital: Lamud

Government
  - Mayor: Horacio Baella Servan

Area
  - Total: 69.49 km^{2} (26.83 sq mi)
- Elevation: 2,350 m (7,710 ft)

Population (2005 census)
  - Total: 2,550
  - Density: 36.7/km^{2} (95.0/sq mi)
- Time zone: UTC-5 (PET)
- UBIGEO: 010501

Lámud is one of 23 districts of Luya Province in Amazonas Region, Peru.

Lámud is located in the mountainous region, and features ruins and caves of the Chachapoya culture. Lámud also is the head office of the government of the Province of Luya.

The public holiday of Lámud is celebrated on September 14, which is the holiday of the Lord of Gualamita.

Lámud borders with San Cristóbal District to the north, Valera District (Bongará Province) to the northeast, Huancas District to the southeast (Province of Chachapoyas), Luya District to the southeast, and with Trita District to the south-west.
