= Pisuquia District =

Coordinates: 6°31′59″S 78°01′59″W

Pisuquia Pisukya
- District
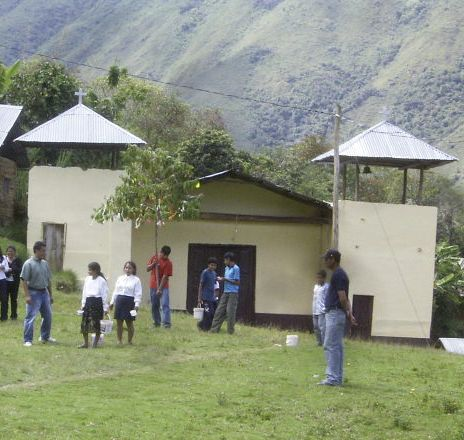
- Yomblon
- Interactive map of Pisuquia
- Country: Peru
- Region: Amazonas
- Province: Luya
- Capital: Yomblon

Government
  - Mayor: Franklin Ludeña Rodriguez

Area
  - Total: 306.5 km^{2} (118.3 sq mi)
- Elevation: 2,000 m (6,600 ft)

Population (2005 census)
  - Total: 5,823
  - Density: 19.00/km^{2} (49.21/sq mi)
- Time zone: UTC-5 (PET)
- UBIGEO: 010514

Pisuquia District is one of twenty-three districts of the province Luya in Peru.
