= Ocalli District =

Ocalli Uqalli
- District
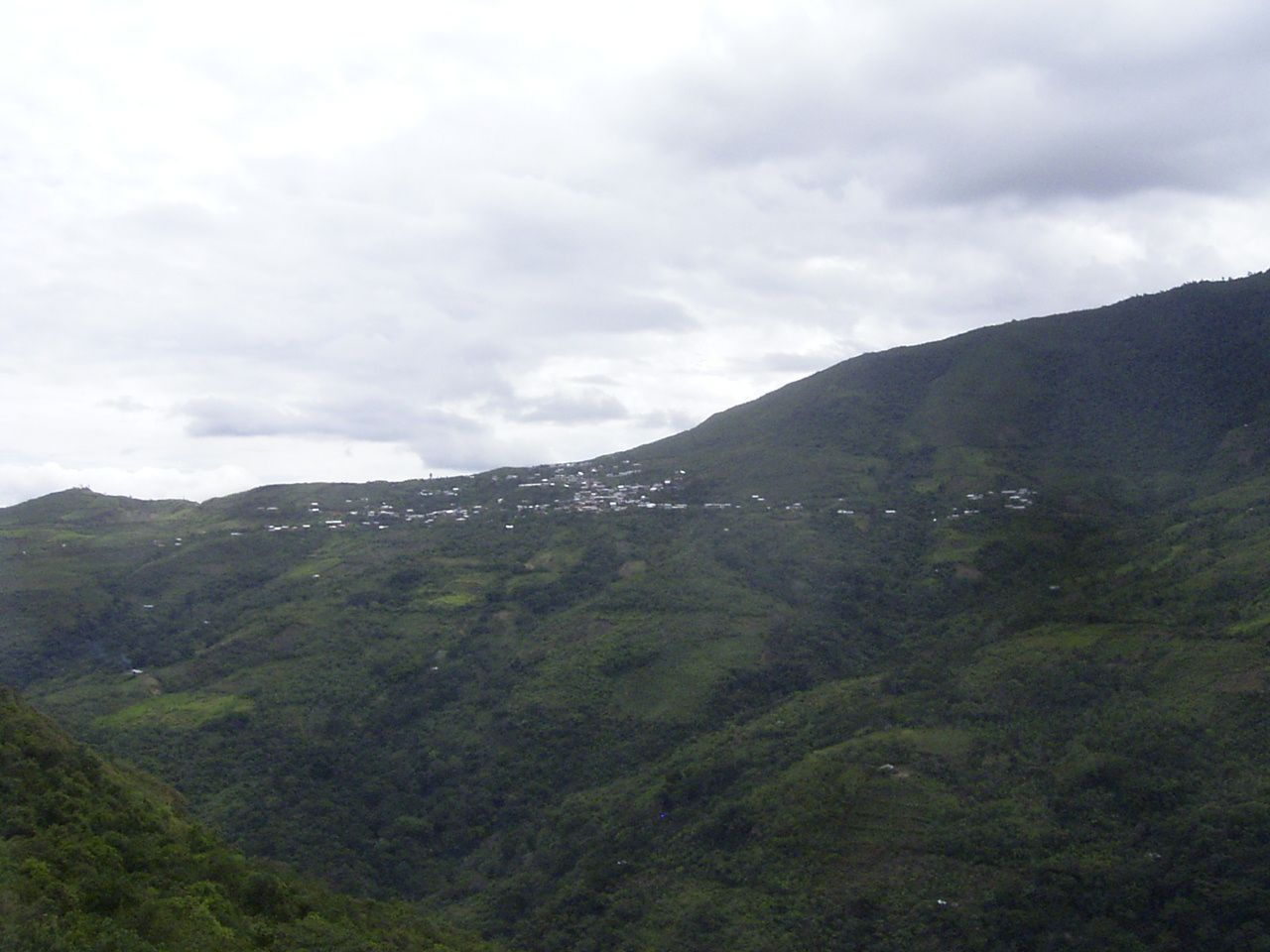
- Landscape of the district of Ocalli
- Interactive map of Ocalli
- Coordinates: 6°15′11″S 78°17′10″W
- Country: Peru
- Region: Amazonas
- Province: Luya
- Capital: Ocalli

Government
  - Mayor: Francisco Cubas Melendez

Area
  - Total: 177.39 km^{2} (68.49 sq mi)
- Elevation: 1,800 m (5,900 ft)

Population (2005 census)
  - Total: 3,729
  - Density: 21.02/km^{2} (54.45/sq mi)
- Time zone: UTC-5 (PET)
- UBIGEO: 010512

Ocalli is a district of the province of Luya, Peru. Cashew spreads from the high mountain towards the shores of the River, with borders to the north with the district of Conila, in the East with Inguilpata, in the southeast with that of Ocumal, in the south-west with the district of Providence, and in the west with Cajamarca. There is a highway that divides from Corral Burned up to the capital of the district, the people of Ocalli, which possesses a big market for the buy and selling of coffee.

The management holidays of the capital Ocalli are celebrated from October 25 until October 28. As typical meals are known by the chochoca, the nickname, the locro, the stew, the churumbo and the cuy with potatoes, between others.

Ocalli offers several attractive places for tourists like whitewater and ruins of the culture Chachapoyas.
