= Providencia District =

Coordinates: 5°03′49″S 78°20′07″W

Providencia
- District
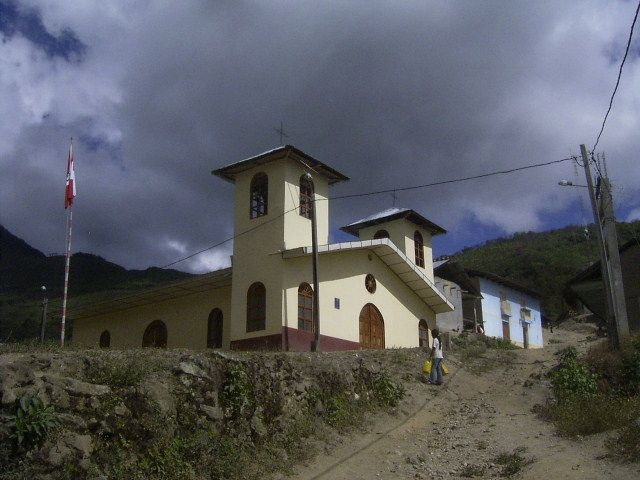
- The church of Providencia and the Main Square
- Interactive map of Providencia
- Country: Peru
- Region: Amazonas
- Province: Luya
- Founded: June 18, 1987
- Capital: Providencia

Government
  - Mayor: Angel Severo Salazar Puerta

Area
  - Total: 71.22 km^{2} (27.50 sq mi)
- Elevation: 1,750 m (5,740 ft)

Population (2005 census)
  - Total: 1,487
  - Density: 20.88/km^{2} (54.08/sq mi)
- Time zone: UTC-5 (PET)
- UBIGEO: 010515

Providencia is a district of the province of Luya, Peru.
