= Cocabamba District =

Cocabamba Kukapampa
- District
- Interactive map of Cocabamba
- Coordinates: 6°36′50″S 78°0′18″W
- Country: Peru
- Region: Amazonas
- Province: Luya
- Founded: February 5, 1861
- Capital: Cocabamba

Government
  - Mayor: Juan Carlos Regalado Saldaña

Area
  - Total: 355.85 km^{2} (137.39 sq mi)
- Elevation: 2,500 m (8,200 ft)

Population (2005 census)
  - Total: 2,133
  - Density: 5.994/km^{2} (15.52/sq mi)
- Time zone: UTC-5 (PET)
- UBIGEO: 010503

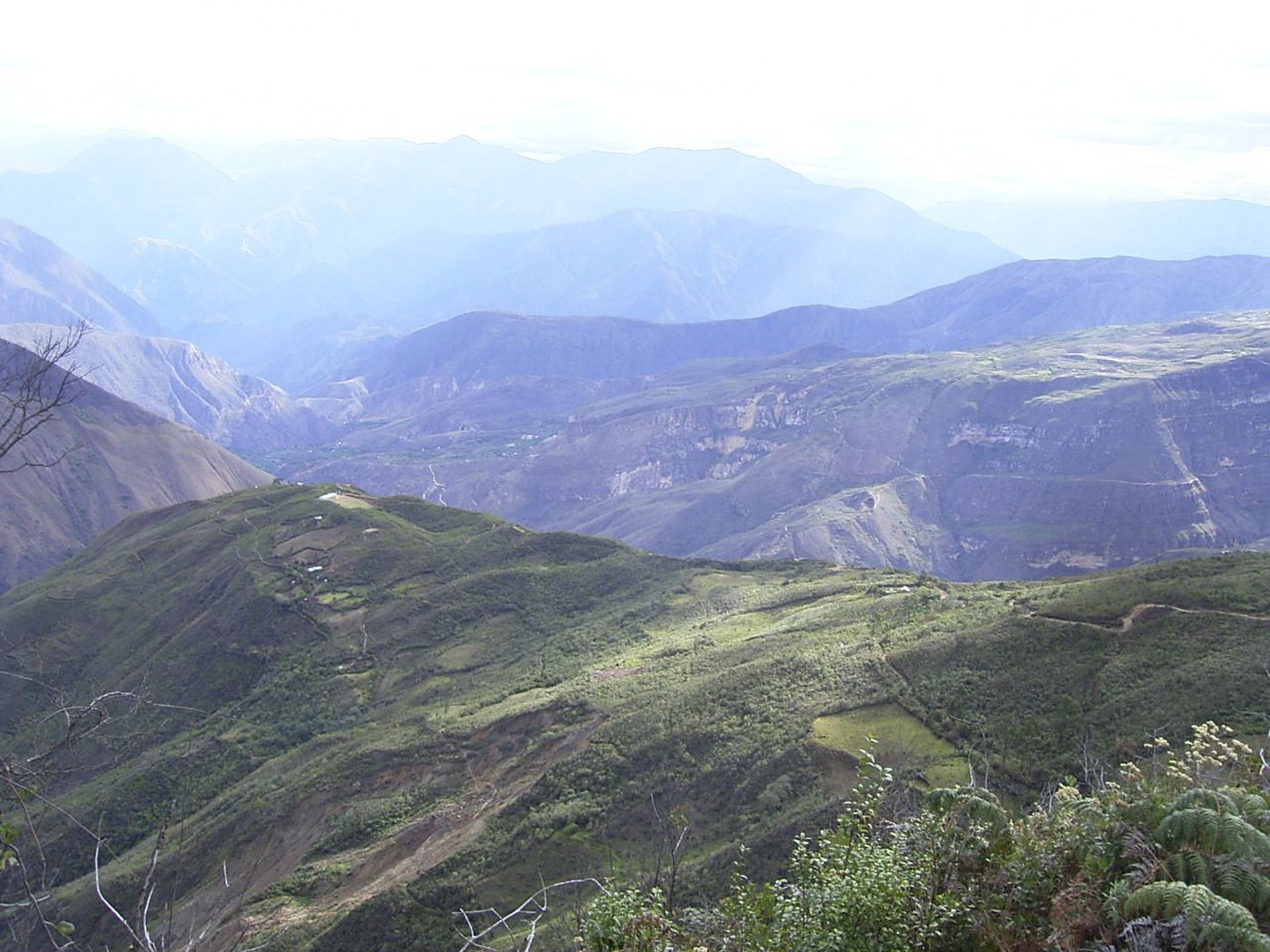
The landscape of Cocabamba

Cocabamba is a district of the province of Luya in the Amazonas Region of Peru.

== Geography ==
Cocabamba is located in a temperate portion where Tomás lowers from the Saint's heights up to the river Cashew.

In the north the District of Cocabamba has border with the District of Pisuquía, in the East with Maria's District, the Saint's District Tomás (Luya) and the District of Leymebamba (Chachapoyas), in the southeast with the District of Rafts (Chachapoyas), in the south-west with the District of Celendin, in the west with the District of Chumuch. The principal entry to the District of Cocabamba is for the Saint's District Tomás (Luya), where it finishes the highway.

== Tourism ==
Cocabamba has several places for tourists, including several waterfalls and ruins of the Chachapoyas culture. The paved roads do not reach all the way to Cocabamba, so people who come by car must walk the last section.

== Culture ==
The public holiday of the capital Cocabamba is celebrated on October 8. Typical meals are the Purtumote (nickname: the Locro), stew and wheat resvaldo, among others. The District of Cocabamba Tomás (Luya) belongs to the parroquía of the Saint's District.

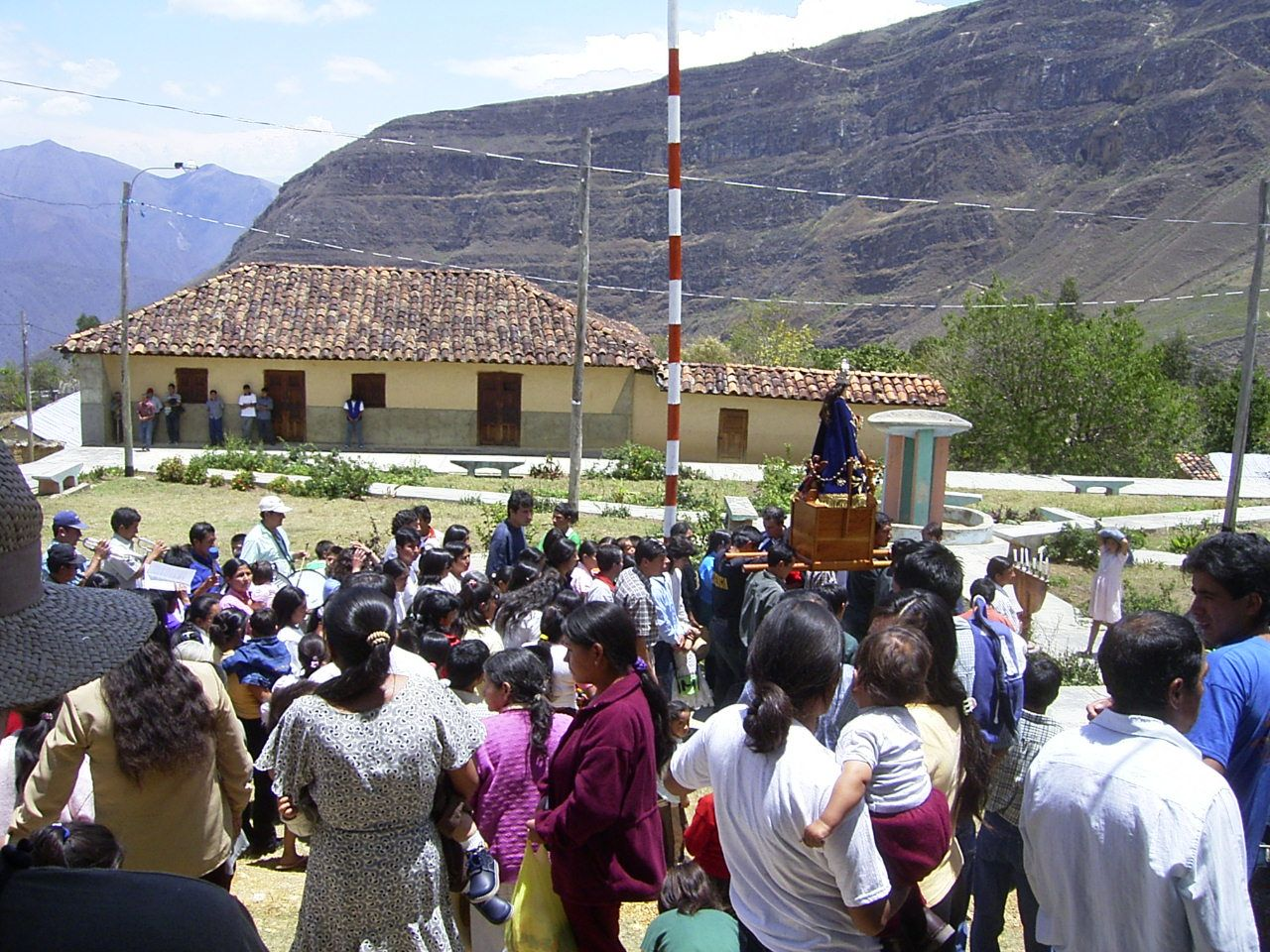
The Main Square of Cocabamba during the Popular Celebrations

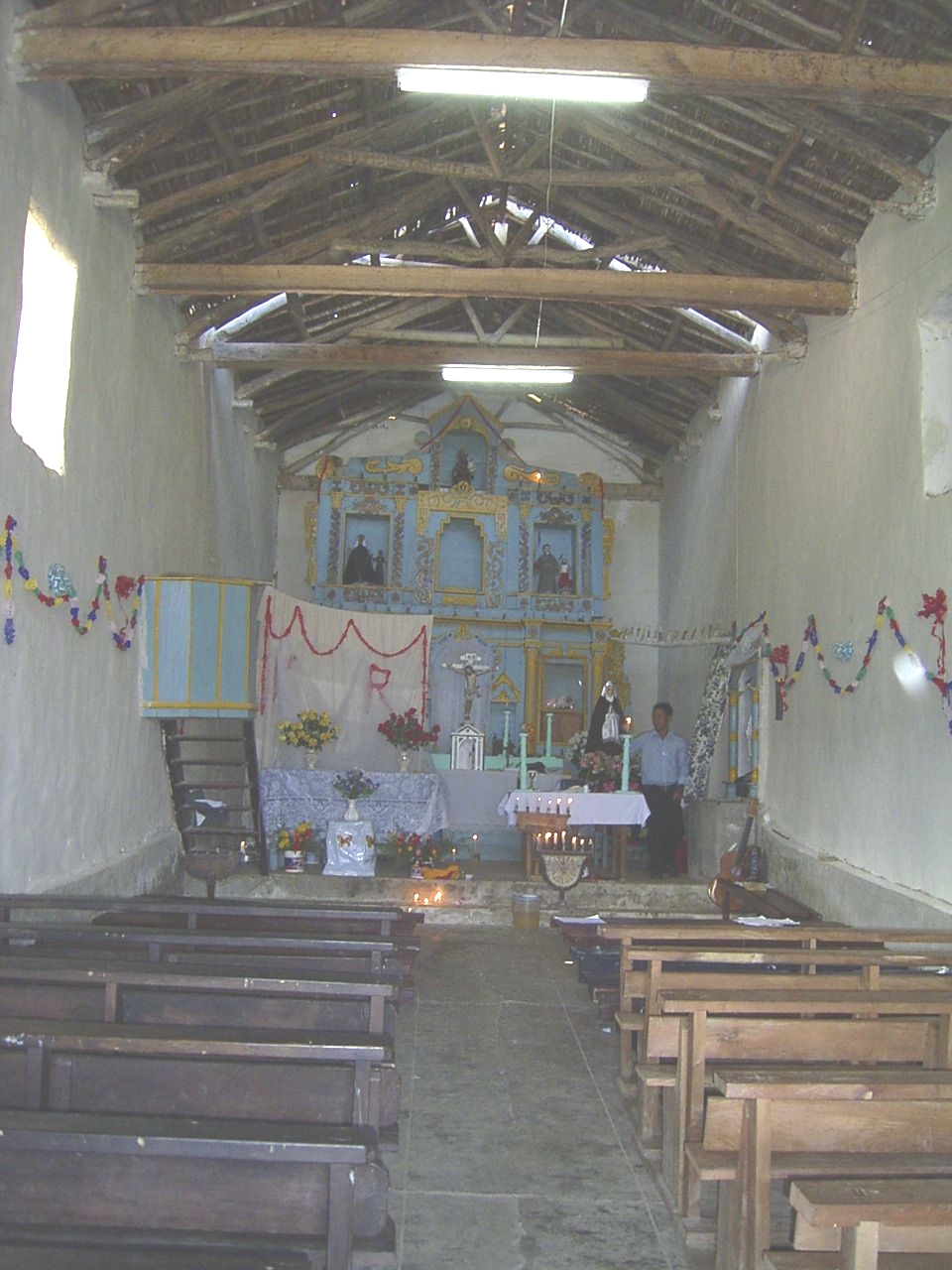
Church of Cocabamba.
