= Ocumal District =

Coordinates: 6°25′01″S 78°07′01″W

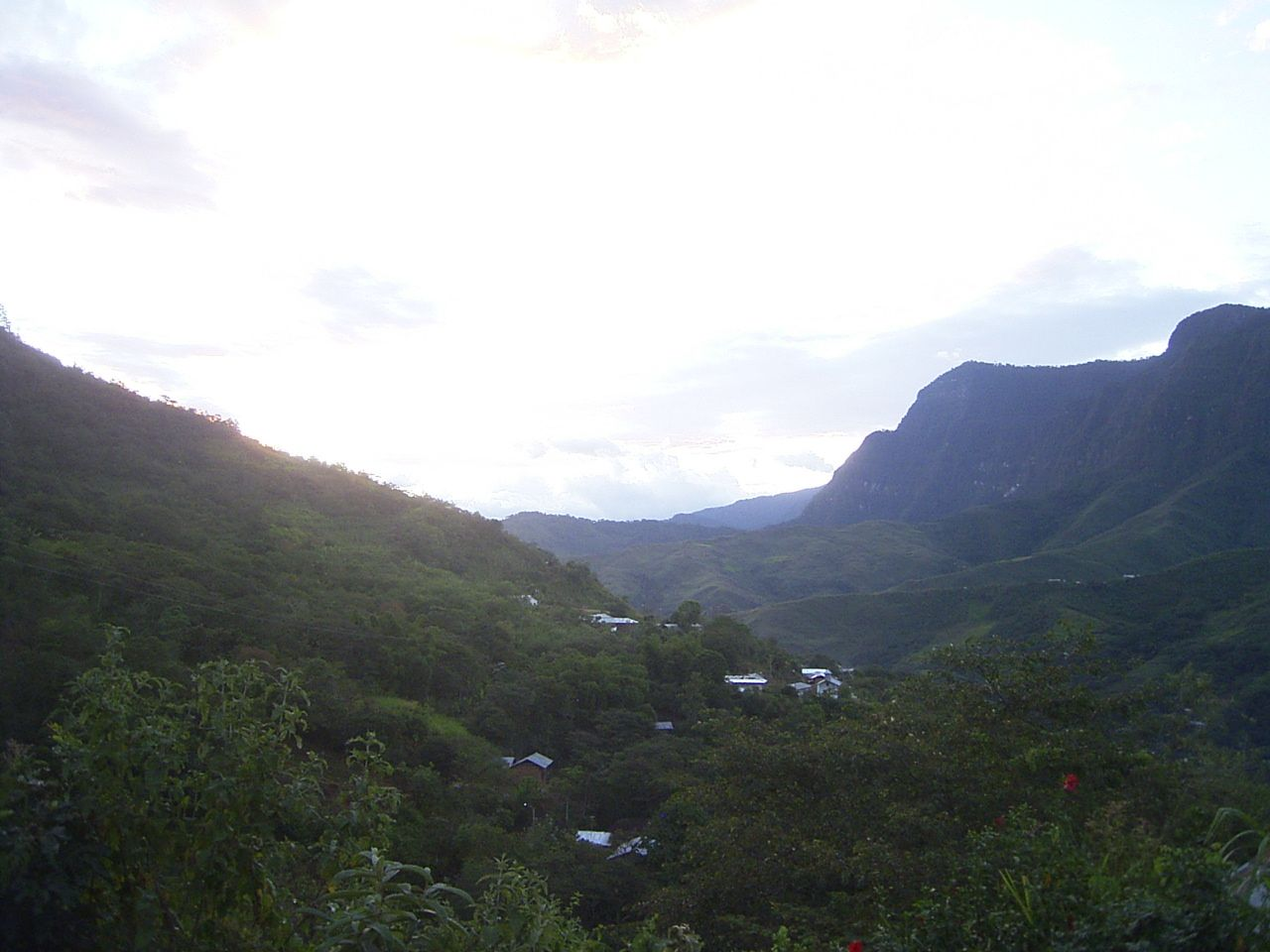
Landscape in the surroundings of Ocumal.

Ocumal is a district of the Peruvian province of Luya. Typical plates of the zone of Ocumal are for example the Purtumote, the Bujon and Shirumbe.

Since there is no highway, it is difficult to gain access to the zone of Ocumal. Thanks to projects undertaken by several ONGs and the municipality, several places benefit from electrical service. No establishment has a wastepipe.

The zone includes several places of tourist interest as for example ruins of the Chachapoya culture or prehistoric paintings in rocks. The variety of fruit grown includes bananas, yucca, coconuts, papayas and others.

To see the customs of the people it is the best thing to come in December, from December 8 until December 10 the management holidays are carried out in Collonce.

The management holiday of Cauldron is August 15, the holiday of the Virgin Asunta.

In the north the District of Ocumal has border with the District of Ocalli and the District of Inguilpata, in the east with the District of Colcamar, in the south with the District of Pisuquía and the District of Rafts in the Department of Cajamarca, in the East with the District of Providence (Luya) and the District of Choropampa. The principal entry to the District of Ocumal is for the District of Colcamar, or for District of Ocalli, where it finishes the highway.
