= San Francisco del Yeso District =

Coordinates: 6.617°S 77.767°W

San Francisco del Yeso
- District
- Interactive map of San Francisco del Yeso
- Country: Peru
- Region: Amazonas
- Province: Luya
- Founded: August 16, 1920
- Capital: San Francisco del Yeso

Government
  - Mayor: Daniel Vargas Vergaray

Area
  - Total: 113.94 km^{2} (43.99 sq mi)
- Elevation: 2,400 m (7,900 ft)

Population (2005 census)
  - Total: 738
  - Density: 6.48/km^{2} (16.8/sq mi)
- Time zone: UTC-5 (PET)
- UBIGEO: 010517

San Francisco del Yeso is a district of Luya Province, Peru. One of its best-known attractions are the ruins of Chachapoya. The region is famous for its plaster mines and crafts.

Its official holiday is on September 23, but religious festivities take place from September 23–27. Special foods consumed during these celebrations are the Locro and Cuy.

On the north, the district borders Santo Tomás Luya; on the East, it borders Castilla Chachapoyas and Montevideo Chachapoyas; on the south it borders Leymebamba Chachapoyas; and on the west, it borders Cocabamba.
