= Longuita District =

Coordinates: 6°25′01″S 77°52′59″W

Longuita
- District
- Interactive map of Longuita
- Country: Peru
- Region: Amazonas
- Province: Luya
- Founded: November 14, 1944
- Capital: Longuita

Government
  - Mayor: Segundo German Chavez Villanueva

Area
  - Total: 57.91 km^{2} (22.36 sq mi)
- Elevation: 2,800 m (9,200 ft)

Population (2005 census)
  - Total: 948
  - Density: 16.4/km^{2} (42.4/sq mi)
- Time zone: UTC-5 (PET)
- UBIGEO: 010507

Longuita is a district of the province of Luya. Longuita is located in the high mountain. Longuita offers several attractive places for tourists as ruins of the culture Chachapoya. To come to Longuita a car takes in the city of Chachapoyas.

The management holidays of the capital Longuita are celebrated from October 4 until October 10, the holidays of San Miguel and San Francisco. As typical meals there is known the Purtumote, the Nickname, the Locro, the cuy with dads and the piquant one of candy stick between others.

The District of Longuita belongs to the parroquía of Magdalena's District (Chachapoyas).

In the north the District of Longuita has border with the District of Colcamar, in the East with the District of Tingo, in the southeast with Maria's District, in the west with the District of Pisuquía and in the northwest with the District of Ocumal.
