= Inguilpata District =

Coordinates: 6.267°S 77.917°W

Inguilpata
- District
- Interactive map of Inguilpata
- Country: Peru
- Region: Amazonas
- Province: Luya
- Founded: October 21, 1942
- Capital: Inguilpata

Government
  - Mayor: Samuel Rodriguez Briceño

Area
  - Total: 118.04 km^{2} (45.58 sq mi)
- Elevation: 2,400 m (7,900 ft)

Population (2005 census)
  - Total: 707
  - Density: 5.99/km^{2} (15.5/sq mi)
- Time zone: UTC-5 (PET)
- UBIGEO: 010506

Inguilpata is a district in the Luya Province, Peru. Inguilpata is located in the high mountains, it offers several attractive places for tourists such as the ruins of the Chachapoya culture as well as a large variety of crafts are available.
