= Tingo river =

Left tributary of the Huallaga River in Peru

Tingo River is located in the Cajamarca Region of Peru. It flows north from near Cerro de Pasco to the Huallaga River. It is classified as hydrographic (river, creek, etc.)
