= Trita District =

District in Amazonas, Peru

Coordinates: 6°10′23″S 77°55′48″W

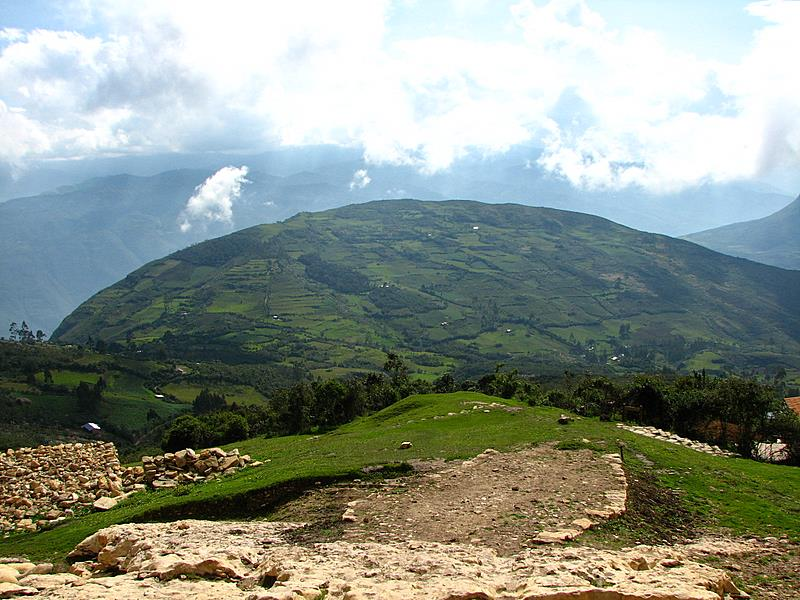
Trita District

Trita is a district of Luya Province in the Amazonas Region in Peru. Trita offers several attractive places for tourists such as the ruins of the Chachapoya culture.

Among the traditional dishes of the district are purtumute and other regional foods.

The district is bordered to the north by the Lámud District and to the south by the Luya District.
