= Colcamar District =

Coordinates: 6.267°S 77.917°W

Colcamar Qullqamar
- District
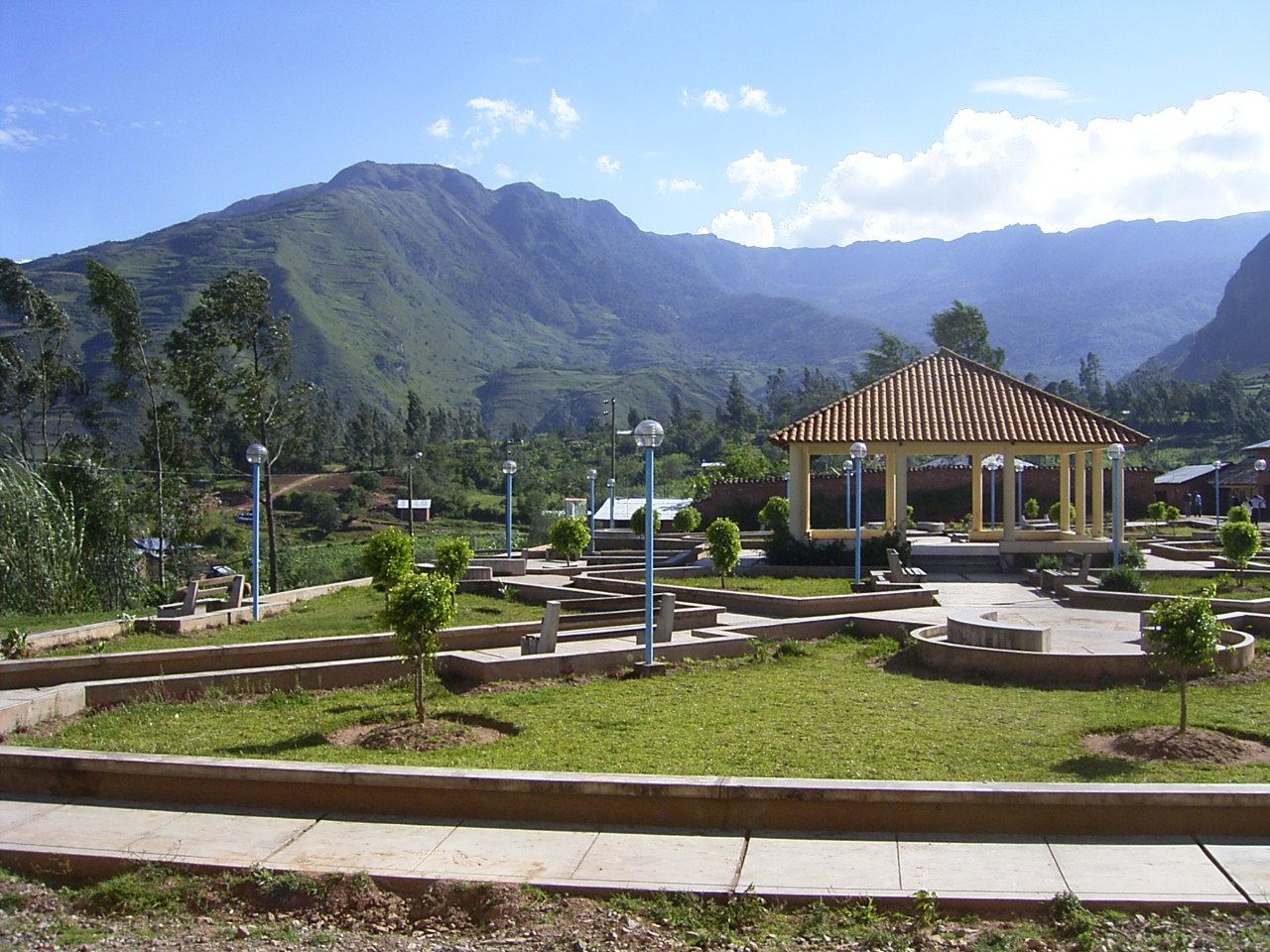
- Plaza de Armas Colcamar
- Interactive map of Colcamar
- Country: Peru
- Region: Amazonas
- Province: Luya
- Founded: February 5, 1861
- Capital: Colcamar

Government
  - Mayor: Riber Juanito Tuesta Bardales

Area
  - Total: 106.6 km^{2} (41.2 sq mi)
- Elevation: 2,304 m (7,559 ft)

Population (2005 census)
  - Total: 2,560
  - Density: 24.0/km^{2} (62.2/sq mi)
- Time zone: UTC-5 (PET)
- UBIGEO: 010504

Colcamar is a district of Luya Province in Peru. Colcamar offers several attractive places for tourists like cataracts, ruins of the culture Chachapoya.

The management holidays of the capital Colcamar are celebrated on September 24. As typical meals there is known the Chochoca, the Nickname, the Locro, the Stew between others.

In Chuquichaca there is the Virgin of Chuquichaca that receives veneration of the local and regional population.

In the north the District of Colcamar has border with the District of Inguilpata, in the East with the province of Chachapoyas, in the southeast with the District The Tingo, in the south-west with the District Longuita, in the west with the District of Ocumal. The principal entry to the District of Pisiquia is the market of Yumal in the District of Colcamar, where it finishes the highway.
