= Conila District =

Coordinates: 6°13′01″S 77°58′01″W

Conila
- District
- Interactive map of Conila
- Country: Peru
- Region: Amazonas
- Province: Luya
- Founded: February 5, 1861
- Capital: Cohechan

Government
  - Mayor: José Genaro Canta Cullampe

Area
  - Total: 256.17 km^{2} (98.91 sq mi)
- Elevation: 3,250 m (10,660 ft)

Population (2005 census)
  - Total: 2,114
  - Density: 8.252/km^{2} (21.37/sq mi)
- Time zone: UTC-5 (PET)
- UBIGEO: 010505

Conila is a district of the Peruvian Luya Province of the Amazonas Region. Conila offers several attractive places for tourists such as the ruins of the culture Chachapoya. Many fruits grow in the zone.

As of 2003, Conila was the last place where Chachapoyas Quechua is still spoken by all ages.

The management holidays of the provincial capital Bribe are celebrated on June 24, and in Conila on June 16. Typical meals there are the Candy stick, the Stew and the Nickname.

In the north the Conila borders the District of Jamalca, in the East, the Saint's District Catalina and the District of Luya Viejo. In the south it borders the District of Lonya Chico and the District of Ocalli and in the west, the District of Camporredondo.

== See also ==
- Kuntur Puna
