= Santa Catalina District =

Coordinates: 6.242°S 77.969°W

Santa Catalina
- District
- Interactive map of Santa Catalina
- Country: Peru
- Region: Amazonas
- Province: Luya
- Founded: November 7, 1955
- Capital: Santa Catalina

Government
  - Mayor: Leoncio Gómez Vela

Area
  - Total: 126.21 km^{2} (48.73 sq mi)
- Elevation: 2,000 m (6,600 ft)

Population (2005 census)
  - Total: 1,630
  - Density: 12.9/km^{2} (33.4/sq mi)
- Time zone: UTC-5 (PET)
- UBIGEO: 010520

Santa Catalina is a district of the province of Luya, Peru. Saint Catalina offers several attractive places for tourists as ruins of the culture Chachapoya and others.

The management holidays of the Holy capital Catalina is celebrated on August 20. As typical meals there is known the soup of Chochoca and the Ucho of Candy stick with dads between others.

In the north the Saint's District Catalina has border with the District of San Jerónimo, in the East with the District of St Kitts and the District of Luya, in the south with the District of Luya Viejo and in the west with the District of Conila.
