= Luya province =

Coordinates: 6.159558°S 77.944466°W

Luya Province
- Province
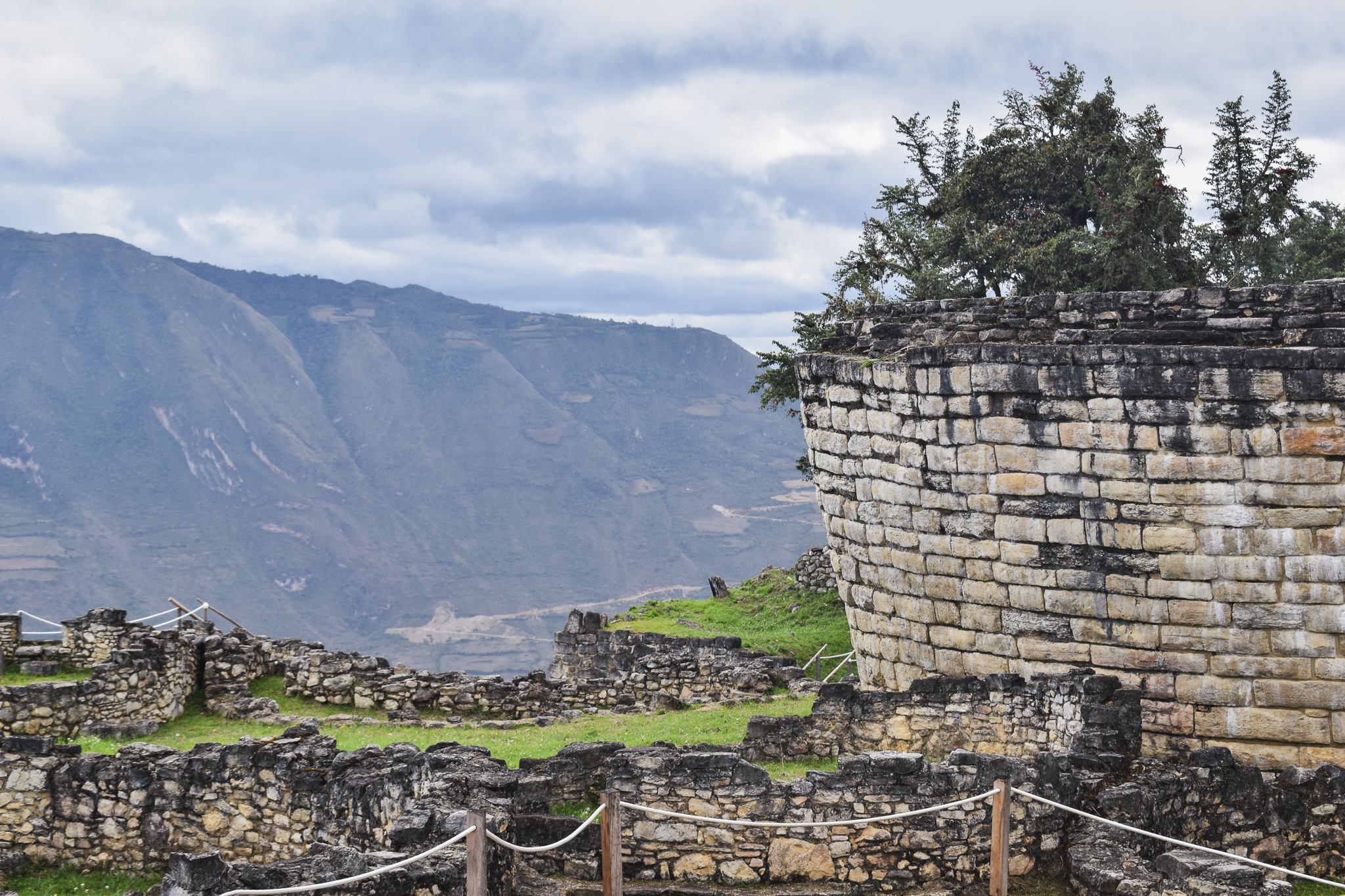
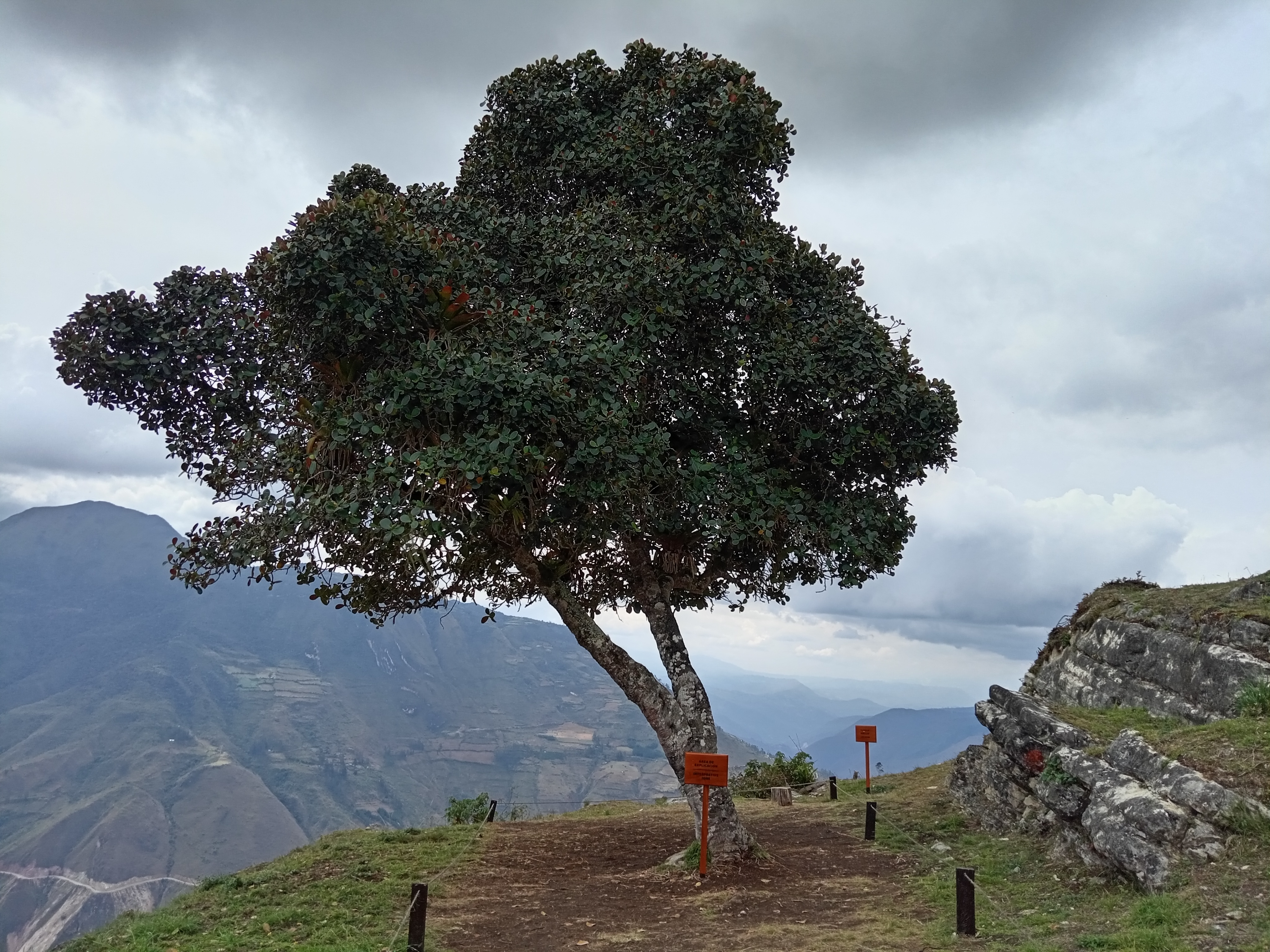
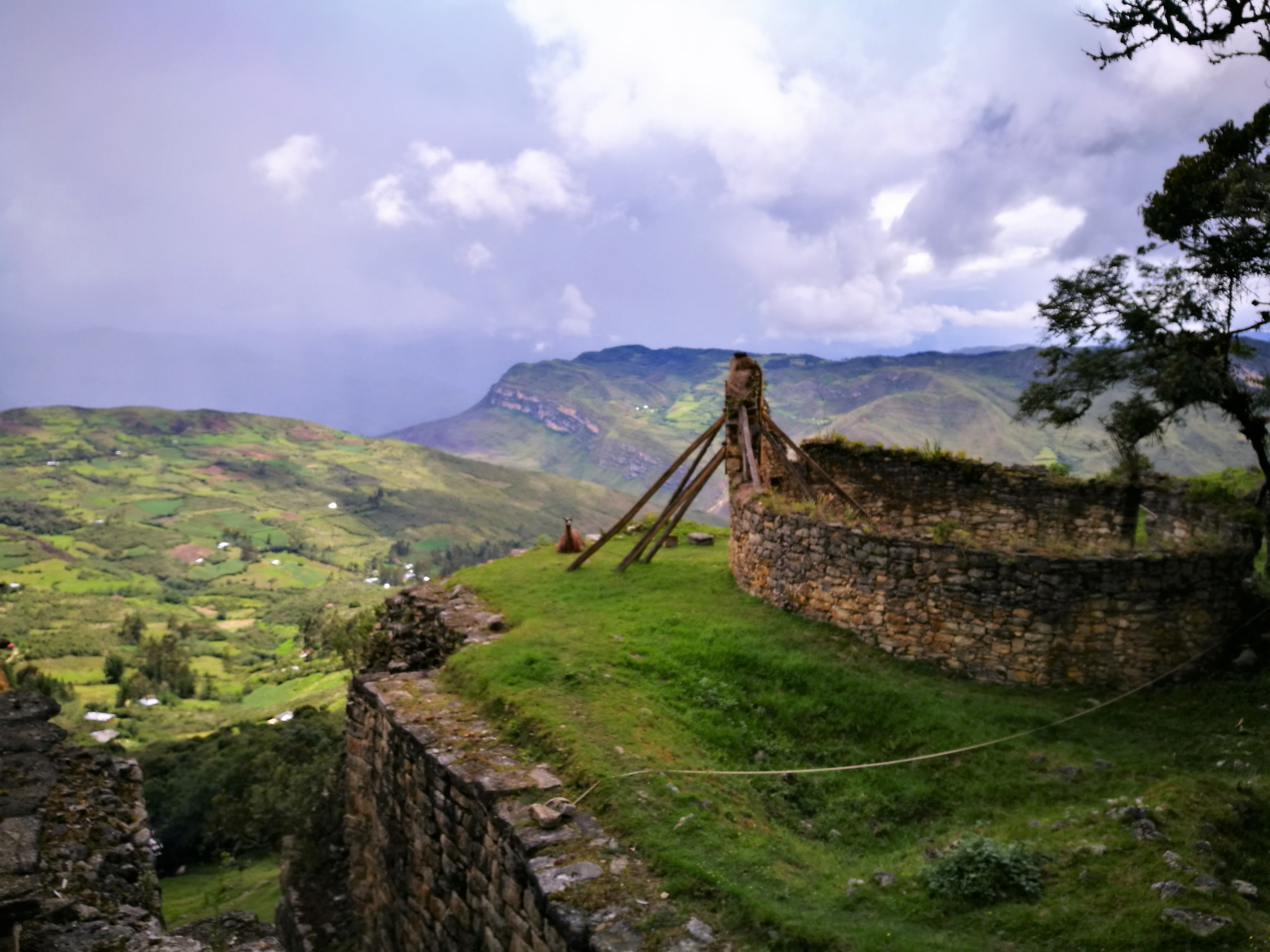
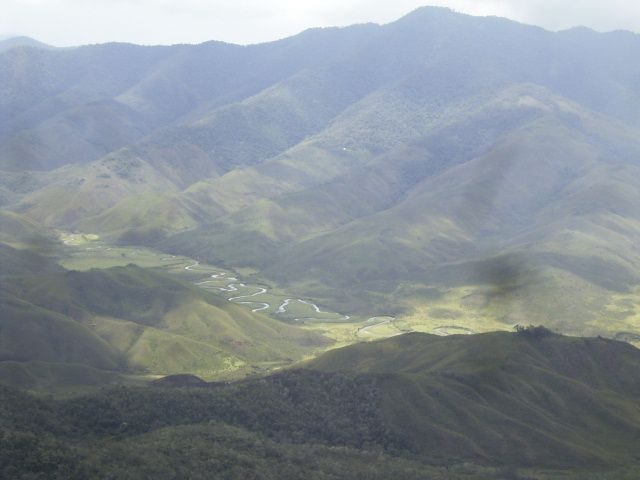
- Kuélap View of the Huaylla-Belén Valley

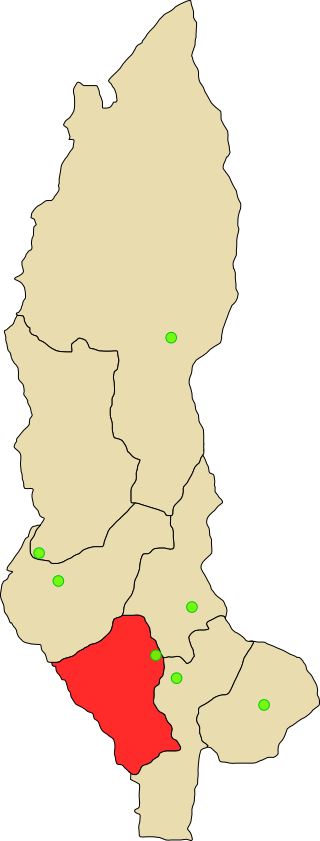
- Country: Peru
- Region: Amazonas

Area
  - Total: 3,237 km^{2} (1,250 sq mi)

Population (2017)
  - Total: 44,436
  - Density: 13.73/km^{2} (35.55/sq mi)

Luya is a province located in the south and west part of the department of Amazonas in Peru.

Its principal rivers are:

- Marañon that flows from south to northwest and forms its extensive west limit with the department of Cajamarca
- Utcubamba, which runs from south to north-east and forms its east boundary with the provinces of Chachapoyas and Bongará
- Magunchal, which is born in the heights of the district of Colcamar, runs from south to north and ends into the Utcubamba, forming its most extensive and rich agricultural zone.

The province was created by law on February 5, 1861, has 23 districts and its capital is Lamud.

== Political division ==
Luya is divided into twenty-three districts, which are:

DISTRICT	MAYOR
Camporredondo	Ubil Roberto De La Cruz Dávila
Cocabamba	José Tomás Ocampo Pérez
Colcamar	Riber Juanito Tuesta Bardales
Conila	Pedro Cachay Huamán
Inguilpata	Samuel Rodríguez Briceño
Lámud	Grimaldo Vásquez Tan
Longuita	Lliner Alfonso Tuesta Serván
Lonya Chico	Homero Mendoza Reyna
Luya	Pedro Quiroz Santillán
Luya Viejo	Candelario Vela Chuquizuta
María	Ramón Salazar Alvis
Ocalli	Carlos Cubas Meléndez
Ocumal	Gilmer Mendoza Reyna
Pisuquia	Juan Tuesta López
Providencia	Segundo Remigio Robledo Jiménez
San Cristóbal	Juan Poquioma Valqui
San Francisco del Yeso	Daniel Vargas Vergaray
San Jerónimo	Pablo Castañeda Gallac
San Juan de Lopecancha	Segundo Silberto Bazán Agirre
Santa Catalina	Exaltación Guelac De La Cruz
Santo Tomás	Hitler Vigo Chauca
Tingo	Juan Francisco Castillo Tocto
Trita	Wilder Rojas Llanos

== See also ==
- Kuntur Puna
