= María District =

Coordinates: 6°27′06″S 77°58′24″W

María
- District
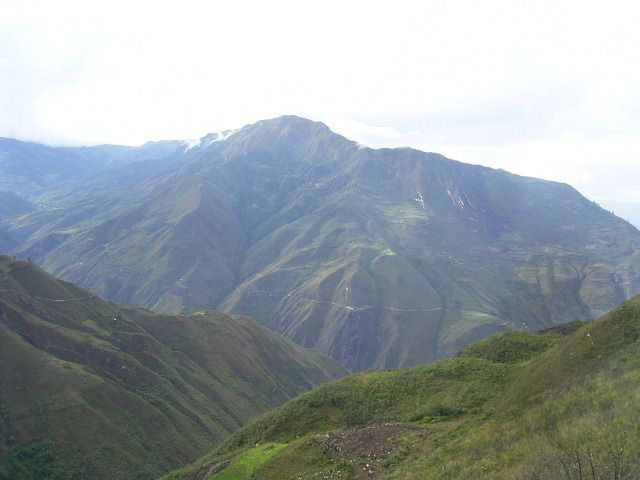
- The landscape and highway in the surroundings of María
- Interactive map of María
- Country: Peru
- Region: Amazonas
- Province: Luya
- Founded: January 27, 1962
- Capital: María

Government
  - Mayor: Manuel Ynocente Bardales Ynga

Area
  - Total: 80.27 km^{2} (30.99 sq mi)
- Elevation: 3,225 m (10,581 ft)

Population (2005 census)
  - Total: 945
  - Density: 11.8/km^{2} (30.5/sq mi)
- Time zone: UTC-5 (PET)
- UBIGEO: 010511

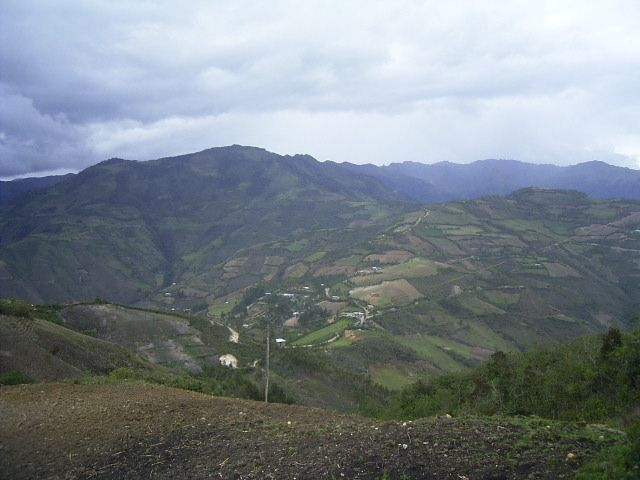
The town of Quizango

María is a district of the province of Luya in Peru. Maria is located in the high mountain. Maria offers several tourist attractions like scenic lagoons and several ruins of the Chachapoya culture. Also, there is a big production of Craft. To reach Maria District, one must take a car from the city of Chachapoyas to which is a 3-hour drive to the district.

The main holiday of Maria is celebrated on July 16. Typical meals are Purtumute, Locro, Tauri Hucho, and Cuy. María District belongs to the parish of Magdalena's District (Chachapoyas).

In the north, the District of Cocabamba has a border with the District of Tingo and the District of Longuita, in the East is with the District of Saint John of Lopecancha, in the south-west with the District of Cocabamba, in the southeast with the Saint's District Tomás (Luya), and in the west with the District of Pisuquía.
