= Magdalena District, Chachapoyas =

Coordinates: 6°21′00″S 77°49′01″W

Magdalena
- District
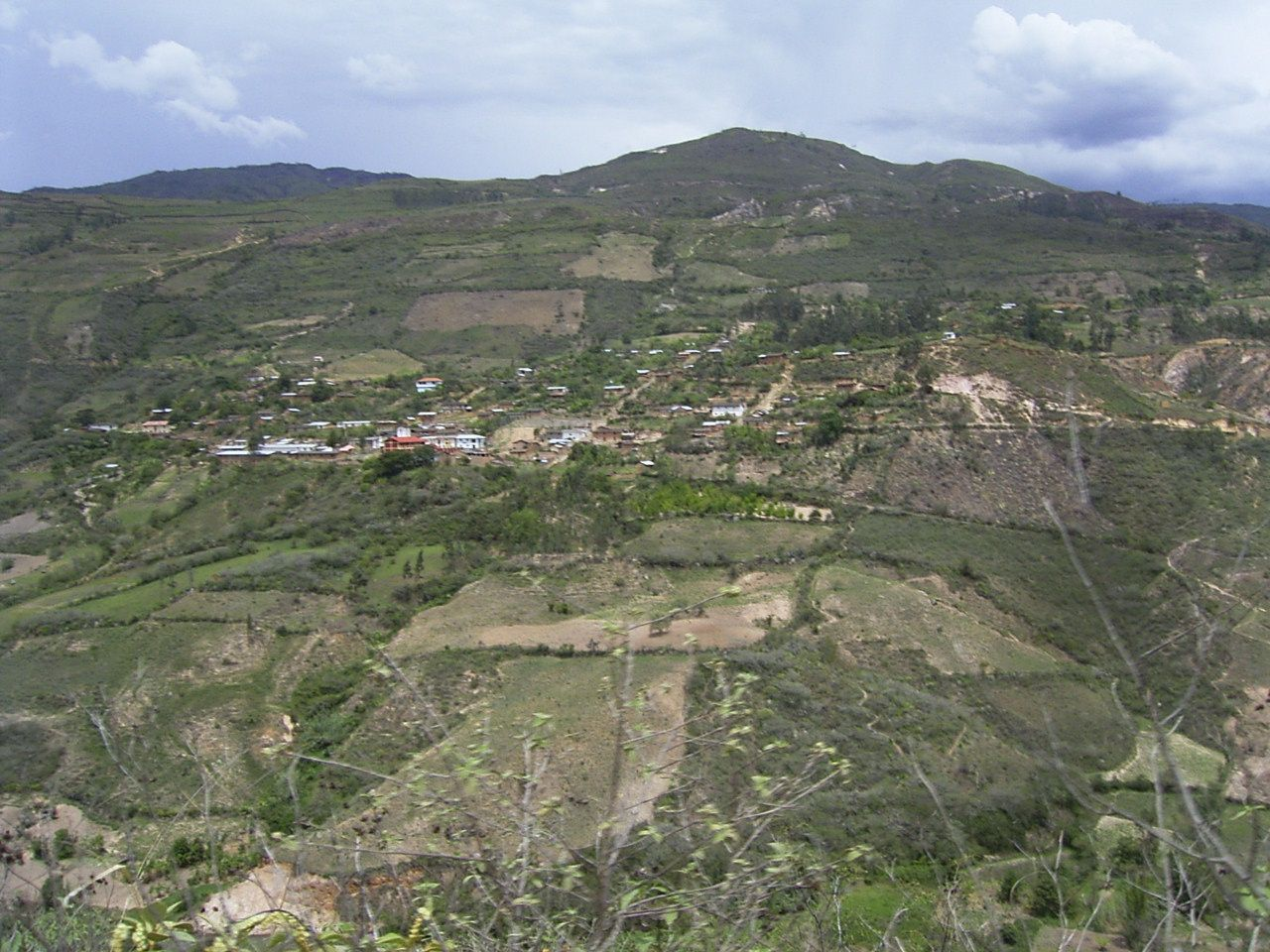
- Magdalena as seen from the district of Tingo
- Interactive map of Magdalena
- Country: Peru
- Region: Amazonas
- Province: Chachapoyas
- Capital: Magdalena

Government
  - Mayor: José Luis Tenorio Tauma (2019 - 2022)

Area
  - Total: 135.47 km^{2} (52.31 sq mi)
- Elevation: 1,980 m (6,500 ft)

Population (2017)
  - Total: 852
  - Density: 6.29/km^{2} (16.3/sq mi)
- Time zone: UTC-5 (PET)
- UBIGEO: 010112

Magdalena is a district of the province of Chachapoyas in the Amazonas Region of Peru.

== History ==
The district was created by the decree of law Nº 7877, signed by the president Óscar R. Benavides.

== Geography ==
Magdalena is located in the south of the Chachapoyas Province, in the high part of the inter-Andean valley of the river Utcubamba. In the north the district borders with the District of San Isidro of Maino (Chachapoyas) and the District of Levanto (Chachapoyas), in the east with the Rodríguez de Mendoza Province, in the south with the District of The Jalca (Chachapoyas), in the southwest with the District of Saint John of Lopecancha and in the west with the District of Tingo.

== Culture ==
As with many Peruvians, popular Magdalenan dishes are the cuy, eaten alongside potatoes, the Sancocho and also the Locro.

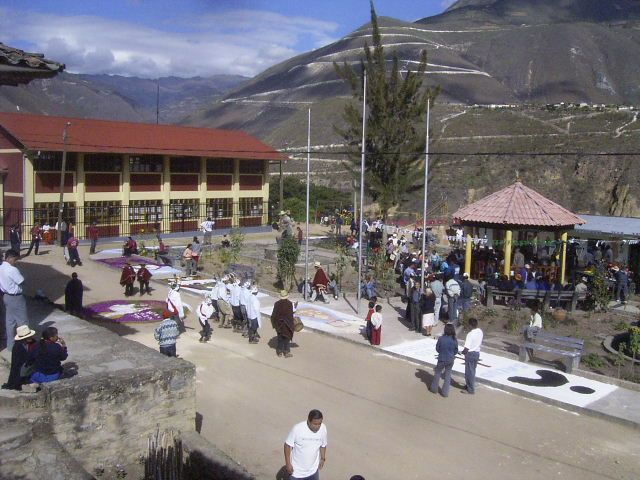
People from Magdalena celebrating

== See also ==
- Machu Pirqa
