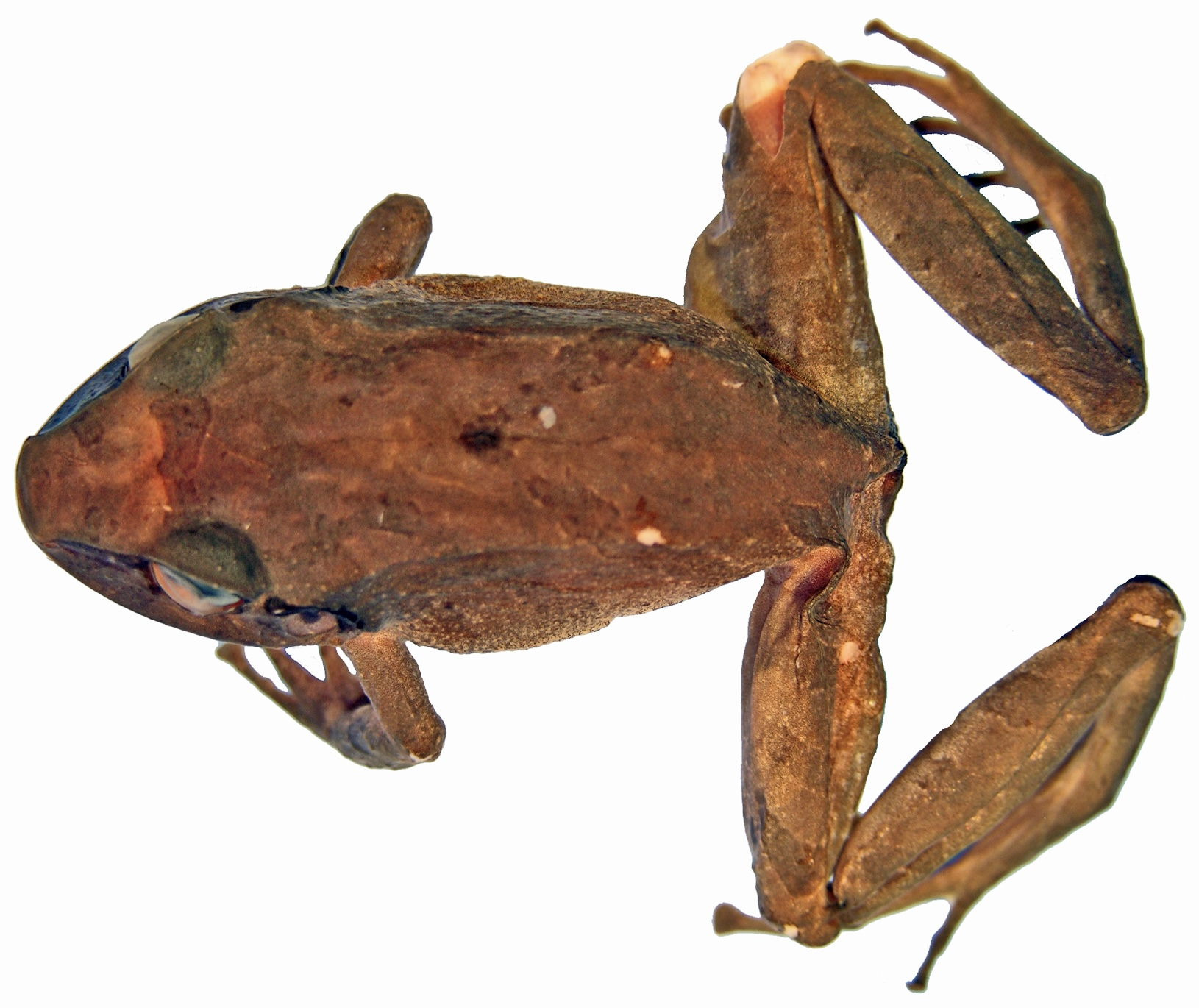

Conservation status
- Least Concern (IUCN 3.1)

Scientific classification
- Kingdom: Animalia
- Phylum: Chordata
- Class: Amphibia
- Order: Anura
- Clade: Brachycephaloidea
- Family: Craugastoridae
- Genus: Pristimantis
- Species: P. avicuporum

Binomial name
- Pristimantis avicuporum (Duellman & Pramuk, 1999)

Synonyms
- Eleutherodactylus avicuporum Duellman & Pramuk, 1999

= Pristimantis avicuporum =

Species of amphibian

Pristimantis avicuporum is a species of frog in the family Strabomantidae. It is endemic to Peru where it is only known from the region of its type locality near La Peca, Bagua Province, in the Amazonas Region of northern Peru. Its natural habitat humid montane forests.
