= Bagua (disambiguation) =

Bagua may refer to:

- Bagua, 8 Daoist cosmological trigrams that show yin-yang
- Baguazhang (Ba gua zhang), shortly Bagua, a Chinese martial art based on Ba gua's principles
- Bakkwa, a salty-sweet dried meat product from China similar to pork jerky
- Bagua, Peru, a town in Amazonas Region, Peru
- Bagua District, a district in Bagua Province, Peru
- Bagua Province, province in Amazonas Region, Peru
- Bagua Grande, a town in Amazonas Region, Peru
- Plain of Bagua, a plain in Bagua Province, Peru
- Bagua Anantapur, a town in Rangpur Division, Bangladesh
- Gossip or Bagua news, rumours about other's private affairs
