= Aramango =

- Location in Peru
- Coordinates: 5°24′59″S 78°26′9″W
- Country: Peru
- Region: Amazonas
- Province: Bagua Province
- District: Aramango District

Aramango is a town and seat of Aramango District in Bagua Province in the Amazonas region of Peru.

== Climate ==
Climate data for Aramango, elevation 508 m (1,667 ft), (1991–2020)
Month	Jan	Feb	Mar	Apr	May	Jun	Jul	Aug	Sep	Oct	Nov	Dec	Year
Mean daily maximum °C (°F)	31.8 (89.2)	32.1 (89.8)	32.5 (90.5)	32.3 (90.1)	32.1 (89.8)	31.5 (88.7)	31.3 (88.3)	32.2 (90.0)	32.7 (90.9)	33.5 (92.3)	33.8 (92.8)	33.2 (91.8)	32.4 (90.3)
Mean daily minimum °C (°F)	20.3 (68.5)	20.4 (68.7)	20.2 (68.4)	20.2 (68.4)	20.2 (68.4)	19.8 (67.6)	19.1 (66.4)	19.0 (66.2)	19.1 (66.4)	19.8 (67.6)	20.5 (68.9)	20.4 (68.7)	19.9 (67.9)
Average precipitation mm (inches)	111.4 (4.39)	122.9 (4.84)	117.5 (4.63)	204.9 (8.07)	228.1 (8.98)	212.2 (8.35)	202.7 (7.98)	136.8 (5.39)	113.9 (4.48)	121.9 (4.80)	99.5 (3.92)	114.2 (4.50)	1,786 (70.33)
Source: National Meteorology and Hydrology Service of Peru
