= Héctor Becerril =

Peruvian politician (born 1957)

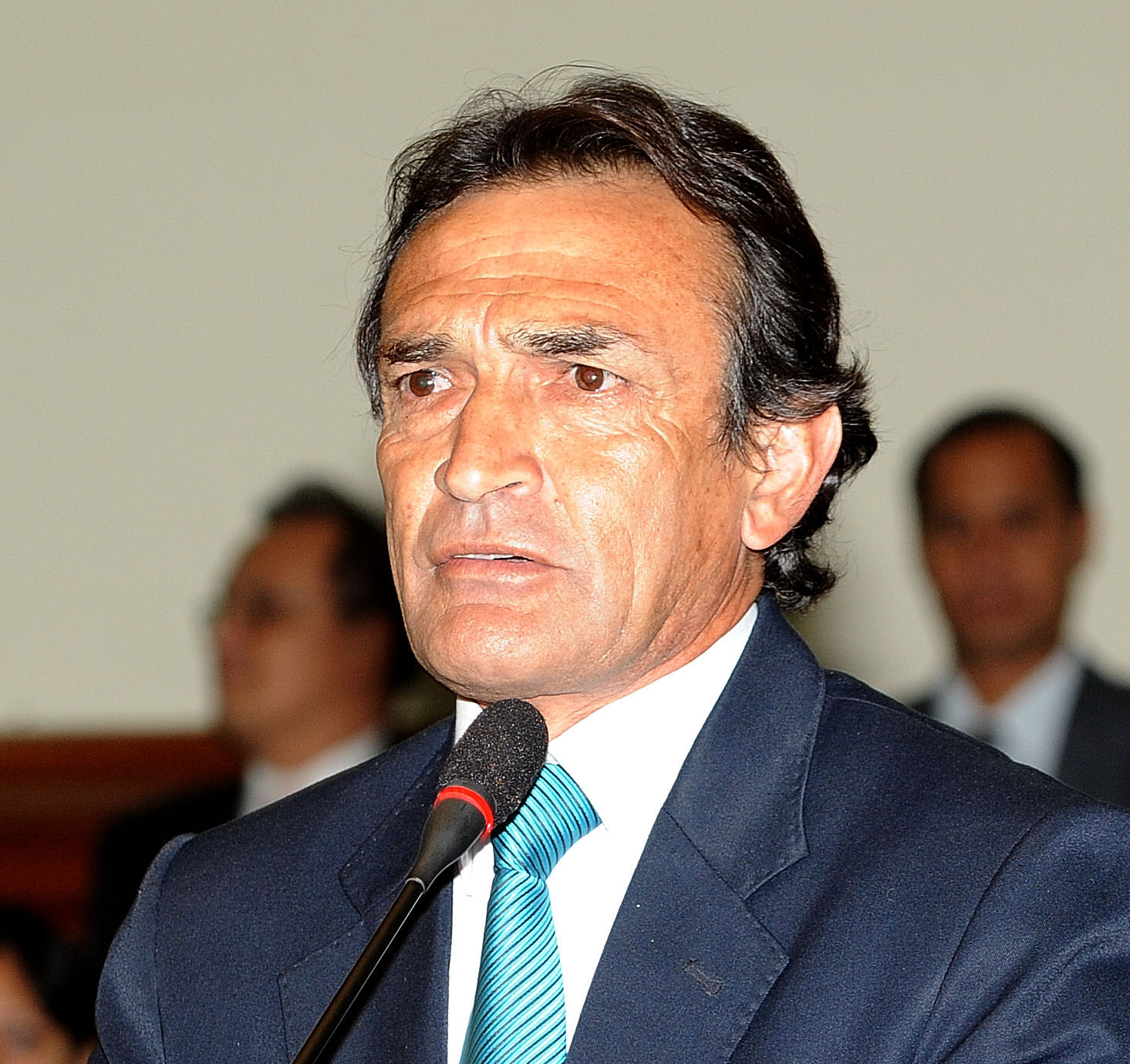

Member of the Congress
- In office 26 July 2016 – 16 March 2020
- Constituency: Lambayeque
- In office 26 July 2011 – 26 July 2016
- Constituency: Amazonas

Personal details
- Born: 28 December 1957 (age 68) Mílpuc, Peru
- Party: Popular Force
- Education: National University of Trujillo
- Profession: Politician

Héctor Virgilio Becerril Rodríguez (born 28 December 1957) is a Peruvian Fujimorist politician and pharmaceutical chemist. He was a congressman in the period 2011-2016 representing the department of Amazonas and in the period 2016-2019 representing the department of Lambayeque.

== Political career ==
=== Congressman ===
On 30 September 2019, after the dissolution of the Congress decreed by former President Martín Vizcarra, his parliamentary position came to an end.

== Controversies ==
=== The Wachiturros of Tumán case ===
In 2008, prosecutor Juan Carrasco reported that congressman Javier Velásquez Quesquén and Héctor Becerril had given political support to the criminal network known as "Los Wachiturros de Tumán." In April 2018, the weekly Hildebrandt referred to that an effective collaborator pointed out that Edwin Oviedo, an alleged member of Los Wachiturros de Tumán, had given money to Velásquez Quesquén and Marisol Espinoza. In March 2019, the technician, Juan Carlos Oblitas, declared before the prosecutor Sandra Castro that he saw these parliamentarians during the Oviedo administration.
