= Peca =

Peca may refer to:

== People ==
- Matthew Peca (born 1993), Canadian ice hockey player
- Michael Peca (born 1974), Canadian ice hockey coach, former player

== Places ==
- Peca Castle, 6th century BC castle in northeastern Albania
- Peca (mountain), in the Karawanks, Slovenia–Austria border
- La Peca, town in Bagua Province, Peru
  - La Peca District, containing the town

== Other uses ==
- Peça, unit of value in the slave trade through the Cape Verde Islands
- PECA Ordinance, for Pakistan's Prevention of Electronic Crimes Act, 2016
