= Llactan =

Archaeological site in Peru

Coordinates: 5.5624°S 78.4437°W

- Location within Peru
- Location: La Peca District, Bagua Province, Amazonas Region

Site notes
- Height: 1,063 metres (3,488 ft)

Llactan (possibly from Quechua llaqta, place) is an archaeological site in Peru. It is situated in La Peca District, Amazonas at an elevation of 1,063 metres (3,488 ft).
