= Cochamal District =

Coordinates: 6°21′S 77°30′W

Cochamal
- District
- Interactive map of Cochamal
- Country: Peru
- Region: Amazonas
- Province: Rodríguez de Mendoza
- Founded: October 31, 1932
- Capital: Cochamal

Government
  - Mayor: José Fausto López Tuesta

Area
  - Total: 199.44 km^{2} (77.00 sq mi)
- Elevation: 1,620 m (5,310 ft)

Population (2017)
  - Total: 595
  - Density: 2.98/km^{2} (7.73/sq mi)
- Time zone: UTC-5 (PET)
- UBIGEO: 010603

Cochamal District is one of twelve districts of the province Rodríguez de Mendoza in the country of Peru.
