= El Parco District =

Coordinates: 5°37′29″S 78°28′29″W

El Parco
- District
- Interactive map of El Parco
- Country: Peru
- Region: Amazonas
- Province: Bagua
- Capital: El Parco

Area
  - Total: 14.37 km^{2} (5.55 sq mi)

Population (2005 census)
  - Total: 932
  - Density: 64.9/km^{2} (168/sq mi)
- Time zone: UTC-5 (PET)

El Parco is a district of Bagua Province, Peru.
