= Santa Rosa District, Rodríguez de Mendoza =

Coordinates: 6°22′01″S 77°25′01″W

Santa Rosa
- District
- Interactive map of Santa Rosa
- Country: Peru
- Region: Amazonas
- Province: Rodríguez de Mendoza
- Founded: February 5, 1875
- Capital: Santa Rosa de Huayabamba

Government
  - Mayor: José Nérido Arbildo Aguilar

Area
  - Total: 34.11 km^{2} (13.17 sq mi)
- Elevation: 1,780 m (5,840 ft)

Population (2017)
  - Total: 512
  - Density: 15.0/km^{2} (38.9/sq mi)
- Time zone: UTC-5 (PET)
- UBIGEO: 010610

Santa Rosa is a district of the Rodríguez de Mendoza Province, Peru. Santa Rosa District is located at an elevation of 1,640 above sea level and covers and area of 36.79 km².

Santa Rosa District, according to projections of the National Institute of Statistics and Computer science for the year 2004 a population of 741 inhabitants is projected doing 89.8% showing a high index of ruralización, whereas in urban area 11.2%
