= Limabamba District =

Coordinates: 6°28′01″S 77°28′01″W

Limabamba Limapampa
- District
- Interactive map of Limabamba
- Country: Peru
- Region: Amazonas
- Province: Rodríguez de Mendoza
- Founded: October 31, 1932
- Capital: Limabamba

Government
  - Mayor: Alinson Riva Novoa

Area
  - Total: 317.88 km^{2} (122.73 sq mi)
- Elevation: 1,680 m (5,510 ft)

Population (2017)
  - Total: 2,280
  - Density: 7.17/km^{2} (18.6/sq mi)
- Time zone: UTC-5 (PET)
- UBIGEO: 010605

Limabamba District is one of twelve districts of the province Rodríguez de Mendoza in Peru.
