= Aramango District =

Coordinates: 5°24′59″S 78°26′09″W

Aramango
- District
- Interactive map of Aramango
- Country: Peru
- Region: Amazonas
- Province: Bagua
- Founded: December 28, 1961
- Capital: Aramango

Government
  - Mayor: Eustacio Tarrillo Segura

Area
  - Total: 815.07 km^{2} (314.70 sq mi)
- Elevation: 550 m (1,800 ft)

Population (2005 census)
  - Total: 12,043
  - Density: 14.775/km^{2} (38.268/sq mi)
- Time zone: UTC-5 (PET)
- UBIGEO: 010202

Aramango is a district of the province of Bagua. The first settlers were the families aguarunas (Holy family and Cumbia), that were located, in what today it is the Principal Park, with the arrival of the colonists in the year 1955 approximately, native these were displaced, sheltering in the first moment in the Native Community of the Reservation Ujucamo and others went to the interior of the forest.

The first colonists who took positions of native grounds in today District of Aramango were the gentlemen: Gonzalo Flores, Javier Milián, the Carlos Flores Acuña the second Eliseo Cotrina Barrantes, Nehemías Silva Terrones, and others that later were going away union and to form the colony of half-caste.

These persons report that they had to face weapon to hardened and brave native and like that to take possession of the ground you fertilize of Aramango, likewise they report that they had to happen for many fortunes due to the climate for his constant rains and illnesses.

These first colonists were coming from the department of Cajamarca, who with covering the time, organized themselves in political and administrative form, this way choosing his first Lieutenant Governor mister José Santos Briceño and the first Municipal Agent mister Juan Terrones Carvajal. With covering the time one was populating and increasing the families, to be able to put his children to the school, it put itself in management on his first school that I create to him in the year 1957, having as his first teacher missis Lidia Altamirano.

Aramango split in two regions of the river Aramango towards the South I locate the native communities The Reservation and that up to the date continue in position of his ground and of the river Aramango to the North the colonists locate and that today are big farmers of coffee, orange, banana, and others devote themselves to the upbringing of dairy cattle. Since he wants that the population was growing every you see more, the colonists turn out to be forced to delimit his territory and power like that to create it as district, it relied on with his requisites of law and one proceeded to the management.

Such is the case that in año1961 creates to itself the district of Aramango by means of the Legislative decree 13789 on December 28 then it was as President of Peru mister Manuel Prado. Of what the settlers of Aramango are grateful to the General of Division of the Peruvian Army Don Miguel Monteza Tafur, who supported with the management of the district so that make a reality, and that today take the name the Educational Institution of Secondary Level Miguel Monteza T. When the district is created he is nominated his first Mayor who was mister Carlos Flores Acuña, who died in July 14th 2020. Today it relies on with 6 That I Centre towns and 54 hamlets.

== Climate ==
Climate data for Aramango, elevation 508 m (1,667 ft), (1991–2020)
Month	Jan	Feb	Mar	Apr	May	Jun	Jul	Aug	Sep	Oct	Nov	Dec	Year
Mean daily maximum °C (°F)	31.8 (89.2)	32.1 (89.8)	32.5 (90.5)	32.3 (90.1)	32.1 (89.8)	31.5 (88.7)	31.3 (88.3)	32.2 (90.0)	32.7 (90.9)	33.5 (92.3)	33.8 (92.8)	33.2 (91.8)	32.4 (90.3)
Mean daily minimum °C (°F)	20.3 (68.5)	20.4 (68.7)	20.2 (68.4)	20.2 (68.4)	20.2 (68.4)	19.8 (67.6)	19.1 (66.4)	19.0 (66.2)	19.1 (66.4)	19.8 (67.6)	20.5 (68.9)	20.4 (68.7)	19.9 (67.9)
Average precipitation mm (inches)	111.4 (4.39)	122.9 (4.84)	117.5 (4.63)	204.9 (8.07)	228.1 (8.98)	212.2 (8.35)	202.7 (7.98)	136.8 (5.39)	113.9 (4.48)	121.9 (4.80)	99.5 (3.92)	114.2 (4.50)	1,786 (70.33)
Source: National Meteorology and Hydrology Service of Peru
