= La Peca =

Coordinates: 5°36′40″S 78°26′06″W

- locality
- Interactive map of La Peca
- Country: Peru
- Region: Amazonas
- Province: Bagua
- District: La Peca
- Time zone: UTC-5 (PET)

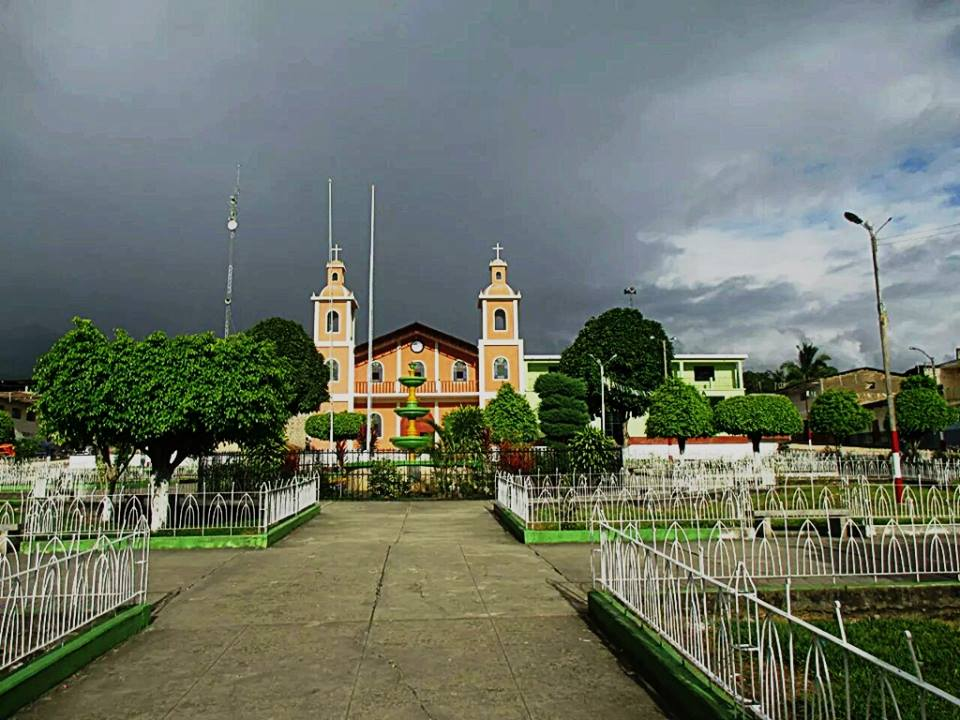

La Peca is a place in La Peca District in the Bagua Province, Amazonas Region, Peru. The town's population is approximately 22,400.

== See also ==
- Llaqtan
