= Huambo District =

Huambo District may refer to:

- Huambo District, Rodríguez de Mendoza, a district of the province Rodríguez de Mendoza, in Amazonas, Peru
- Huambo District, Caylloma, a district of the province Caylloma in Arequipa, Peru

== See also ==
- Huambo Province, Angola
