= Longar District =

Coordinates: 6°18′00″S 77°28′01″W

Longar
- District
- Interactive map of Longar
- Country: Peru
- Region: Amazonas
- Province: Rodríguez de Mendoza
- Founded: October 31, 1932
- Capital: Longar

Government
  - Mayor: Amando López Muñoz

Area
  - Total: 66.24 km^{2} (25.58 sq mi)
- Elevation: 1,600 m (5,200 ft)

Population (2017)
  - Total: 1,631
  - Density: 24.62/km^{2} (63.77/sq mi)
- Time zone: UTC-5 (PET)
- UBIGEO: 010606

Longar District is one of twelve districts of the province Rodríguez de Mendoza in Peru.
