= Mariscal Benavides District =

Coordinates: 6.300°S 77.417°W

Mariscal Benavides
- District
- Interactive map of Mariscal Benavides
- Country: Peru
- Region: Amazonas
- Province: Rodríguez de Mendoza
- Founded: February 2, 1956
- Capital: Mariscal Benavides

Government
  - Mayor: Nilser Tafur Peláez

Area
  - Total: 176.18 km^{2} (68.02 sq mi)
- Elevation: 1,700 m (5,600 ft)

Population (2017)
  - Total: 1,506
  - Density: 8.548/km^{2} (22.14/sq mi)
- Time zone: UTC-5 (PET)
- UBIGEO: 010607

Mariscal Benavides District (Spanish mariscal marshal) is one of twelve districts of the province Rodríguez de Mendoza in Peru.
