= Imaza District =

Coordinates: 5°09′36″S 78°17′20″W

Imaza
- District
- Interactive map of Imaza
- Country: Peru
- Region: Amazonas
- Province: Bagua
- Capital: Chiriaco

Area
  - Total: 4,534.7 km^{2} (1,750.9 sq mi)

Population (2005 census)
  - Total: 21,409
  - Density: 4.7212/km^{2} (12.228/sq mi)
- Time zone: UTC-5 (PET)

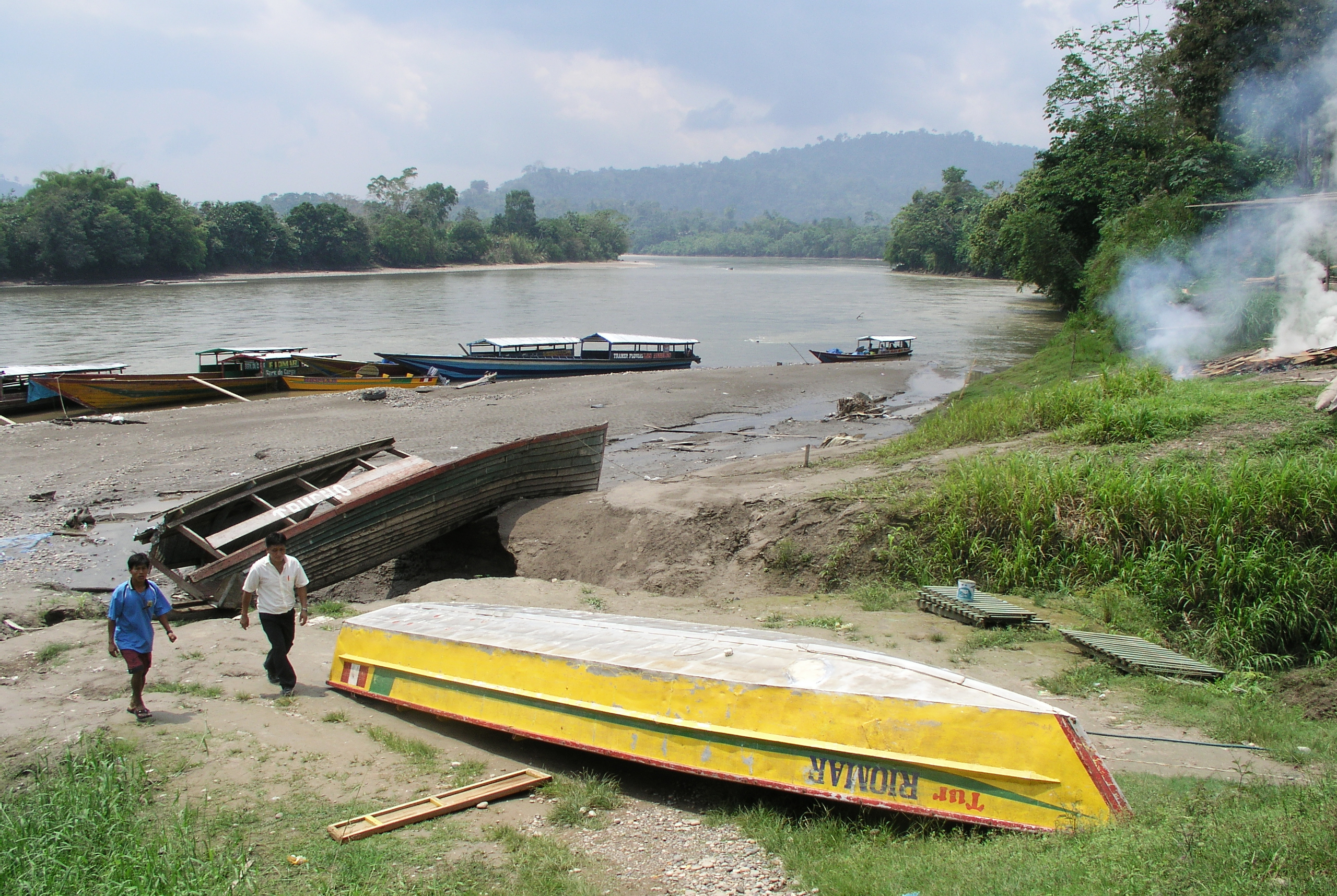
The Marañón river in Imacita, Imaza, Bagua, Amazonas, Peru.

Imaza is a district of Bagua Province, Peru.
