= Vista Alegre District, Rodríguez de Mendoza =

Coordinates: 6°09′S 77°21′W

Vista Alegre
- District
- Interactive map of Vista Alegre
- Country: Peru
- Region: Amazonas
- Province: Rodríguez de Mendoza
- Founded: October 31, 1932
- Capital: Vista Alegre

Government
  - Mayor: Milder Rojas Campos

Area
  - Total: 899.02 km^{2} (347.11 sq mi)
- Elevation: 1,500 m (4,900 ft)

Population (2017)
  - Total: 2,812
  - Density: 3.128/km^{2} (8.101/sq mi)
- Time zone: UTC-5 (PET)
- UBIGEO: 010612
- Website: munivistaalegre.gob.pe

Vista Alegre District is one of twelve districts of the province Rodríguez de Mendoza in Peru.
