= Nazareth, Peru =

Nazareth
- Interactive map of Nazareth
- Coordinates: 5°8′17″S 78°19′11″W
- Country: Peru
- Region: Amazonas
- Province: Bagua
- Elevation: 271 m (889 ft)

Nazareth is a native community in the Bagua Province, Amazonas Region, Peru. The elevation above sea level is 271 meters (889 feet). The nearest airport is named SHUMBA, bearing 224 airlines, located at 5°35′33″S 78°46′26″W.
