= Totora District =

Coordinates: 6.388°S 77.5168°W

Totora Tutura
- District
- Interactive map of Totora
- Country: Peru
- Region: Amazonas
- Province: Rodríguez de Mendoza
- Founded: February 5, 1875
- Capital: Totora

Government
  - Mayor: Julio César Fernández Portocarrero

Area
  - Total: 6.02 km^{2} (2.32 sq mi)
- Elevation: 1,650 m (5,410 ft)

Population (2017)
  - Total: 282
  - Density: 46.8/km^{2} (121/sq mi)
- Time zone: UTC-5 (PET)
- UBIGEO: 010611

Totora District is one of twelve districts of the province Rodríguez de Mendoza in Peru.
