= Omia District =

Coordinates: 6°25′01″S 77°19′01″W

Omia
- District
- Interactive map of Omia
- Country: Peru
- Region: Amazonas
- Province: Rodríguez de Mendoza
- Founded: February 05, 1875
- Capital: Omia

Government
  - Mayor: Javier Del Águila Tafur

Area
  - Total: 175.13 km^{2} (67.62 sq mi)
- Elevation: 1,395 m (4,577 ft)

Population (2017)
  - Total: 8,793
  - Density: 50.21/km^{2} (130.0/sq mi)
- Time zone: UTC-5 (PET)
- UBIGEO: 010609

Omia is a district of the province of Rodríguez de Mendoza in Peru.

According to documentary sources, it was founded on February 5, 1875, from the District of Huayabamba, together with Totora, Pink Saint and San Nicolás.
