= Carta sobre los maricones =

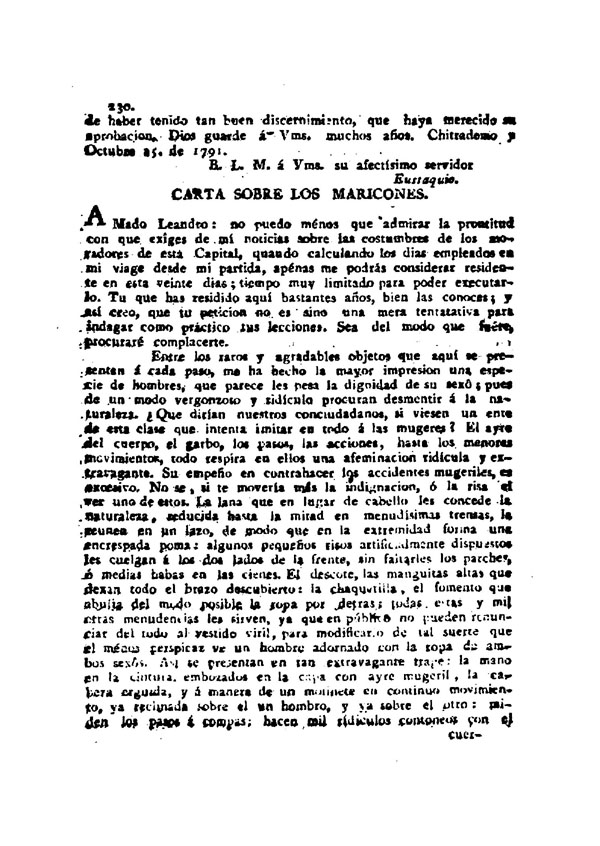
- Created: 27 November 1791
- Location: Mercurio Peruano
- Author: José Mariano de Aguirre y Mayora
- Purpose: condemning transvestism and homosexual practices

Carta sobre los maricones (lit. A letter about faggots) is a text published in the Peruvian newspaper Mercurio Peruano on 27 November 1791, attributed to the priest José Mariano de Aguirre y Mayora, who signed it under the pseudonym "Sophronio". It is one of the first works written in Peru that mentions transvestism and sexual diversity.

The letter, dated August 1773 in "Androginópolis"—a satirical name given to the city of Lima in the 18th century— is written by a character called "Filaletes", who writes to his friend Leandro describing the habits of Lima society, using satirical language to refer to androgynous people (maricones) and with a marked moralistic tone condemning transvestism and homosexual practices.

The publication of Carta sobre los maricones generated reactions among Lima society: in the 19 February 1792 edition of the Mercurio Peruano appeared a missive entitled "Letter sent to society making some reflections on the one contained in Mercurio no. 94, in which homosexuals are depicted" (Spanish: Carta remitida á la sociedad haciendo algunas reflexiones sobre la que se contiene en el Mercurio núm. 94, en que se pinta á los Maricones), written by the priest Tomás Mendez y Lachica — censor of the Sociedad Académica de Amantes del País — under the pseudonym "Teagnes", and which sought to decipher the causes that would lead some men to adopt feminine behaviors.
