= San Nicolás District, Rodríguez de Mendoza =

Coordinates: 6°19′59″S 77°24′00″W

San Nicolás
- District
- Interactive map of San Nicolás
- Country: Peru
- Region: Amazonas
- Province: Rodríguez de Mendoza
- Founded: February 5, 1875
- Capital: Mendoza

Government
  - Mayor: Helder Rodríguez Zelada

Area
  - Total: 206.01 km^{2} (79.54 sq mi)
- Elevation: 1,575 m (5,167 ft)

Population (2017)
  - Total: 6,016
  - Density: 29.20/km^{2} (75.63/sq mi)
- Time zone: UTC-5 (PET)
- UBIGEO: 010601

San Nicolás District is one of twelve districts of the province Rodríguez de Mendoza in Peru.
