= Chirimoto District =

Coordinates: 6°31′01″S 77°24′00″W

Chirimoto
- District
- Interactive map of Chirimoto
- Country: Peru
- Region: Amazonas
- Province: Rodríguez de Mendoza
- Founded: October 31, 1932
- Capital: Chirimoto

Government
  - Mayor: Teófilo Izquierdo León

Area
  - Total: 153 km^{2} (59 sq mi)
- Elevation: 2,000 m (6,600 ft)

Population (2017)
  - Total: 2,498
  - Density: 16.3/km^{2} (42.3/sq mi)
- Time zone: UTC-5 (PET)
- UBIGEO: 010602

Chirimoto District is one of twelve districts of the province Rodríguez de Mendoza in Peru.

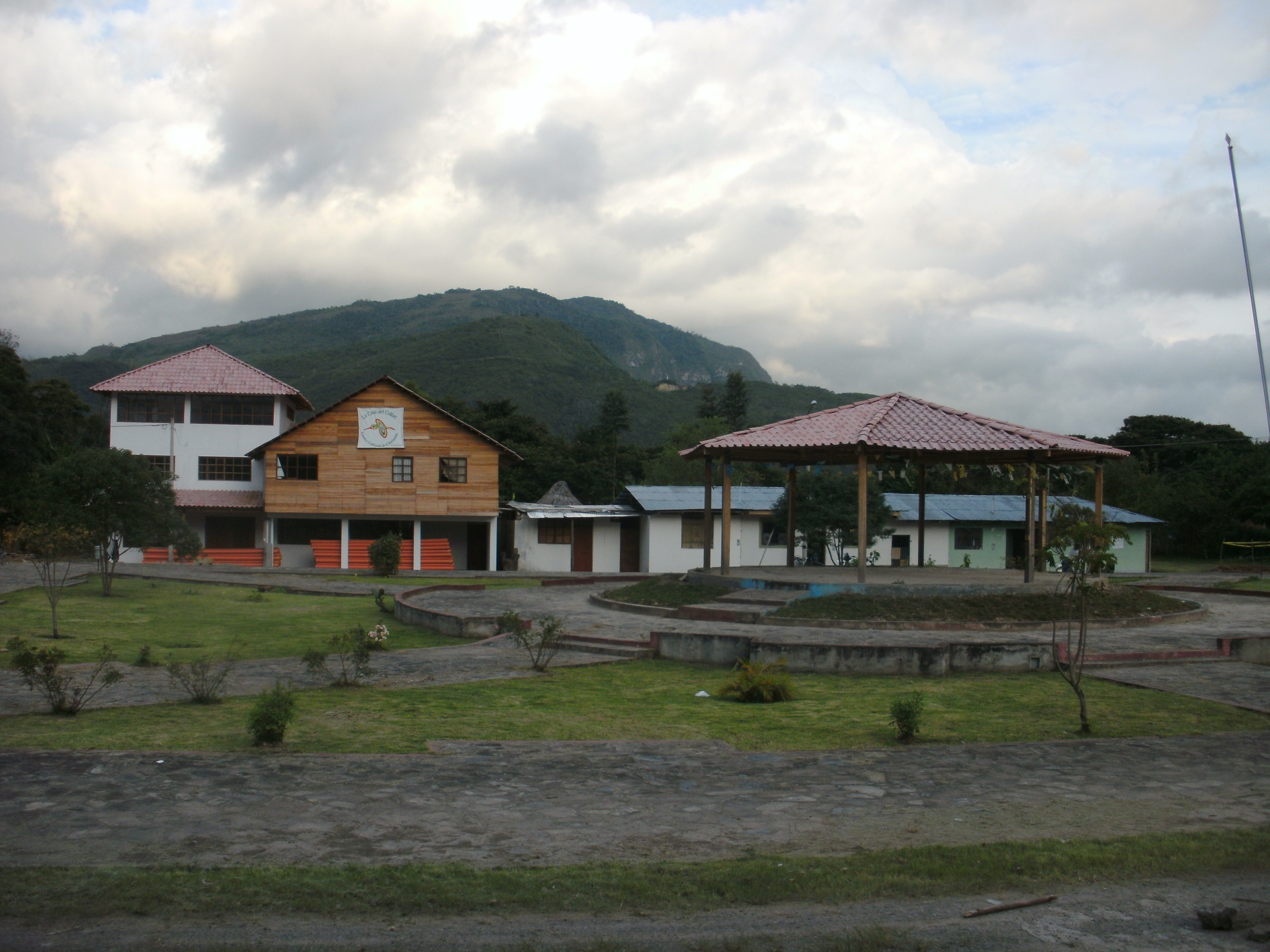
Sociocultural centre Colibri, Chirimoto
