= Gran Vilaya =

Archaeological site in Peru

Coordinates: 6.2944°S 78.0968°W

- Location within Peru
- Type: Settlement
- Periods: Middle Horizon - Late Intermediate
- Cultures: Chachapoya
- Location: Luya Province, Amazonas, Peru

Gran Vilaya is a complex of many archaeological remains and ruins, spread over a wide area in the Utcubamba Valley in northern Peru.

Gene Savoy, an American explorer, discovered and named the complex in 1985. Located to the west of Kuelap fortress, it is characterized by ruins centres of population such as the Stairs, the Pirquilla, Cacahuasha, Mortar, the Bishop, Paxamarca, Lanche, and the Secret. There are 15–30 main sites and hundreds of smaller sites as well. This entire complex dates from the pre-Incan Chachapoya culture.

It is estimated that approximately 5,000 buildings exist within the greater Gran Vilaya area, some circular and some rectangular, all constructed of local limestone with geometrical shapes embossed on the walls of many, representing humans and animals such as the snake, condor or puma (the former in zig-zag patterns, the latter in diamond shapes representing their eyes).

Several travel agencies offer trekking trips into the area, crossing mountain ranges on foot and horseback and finishing at the fortress of Kuelap.
