= Hipólito Unanue =

Peruvian physician, naturalist, and politician

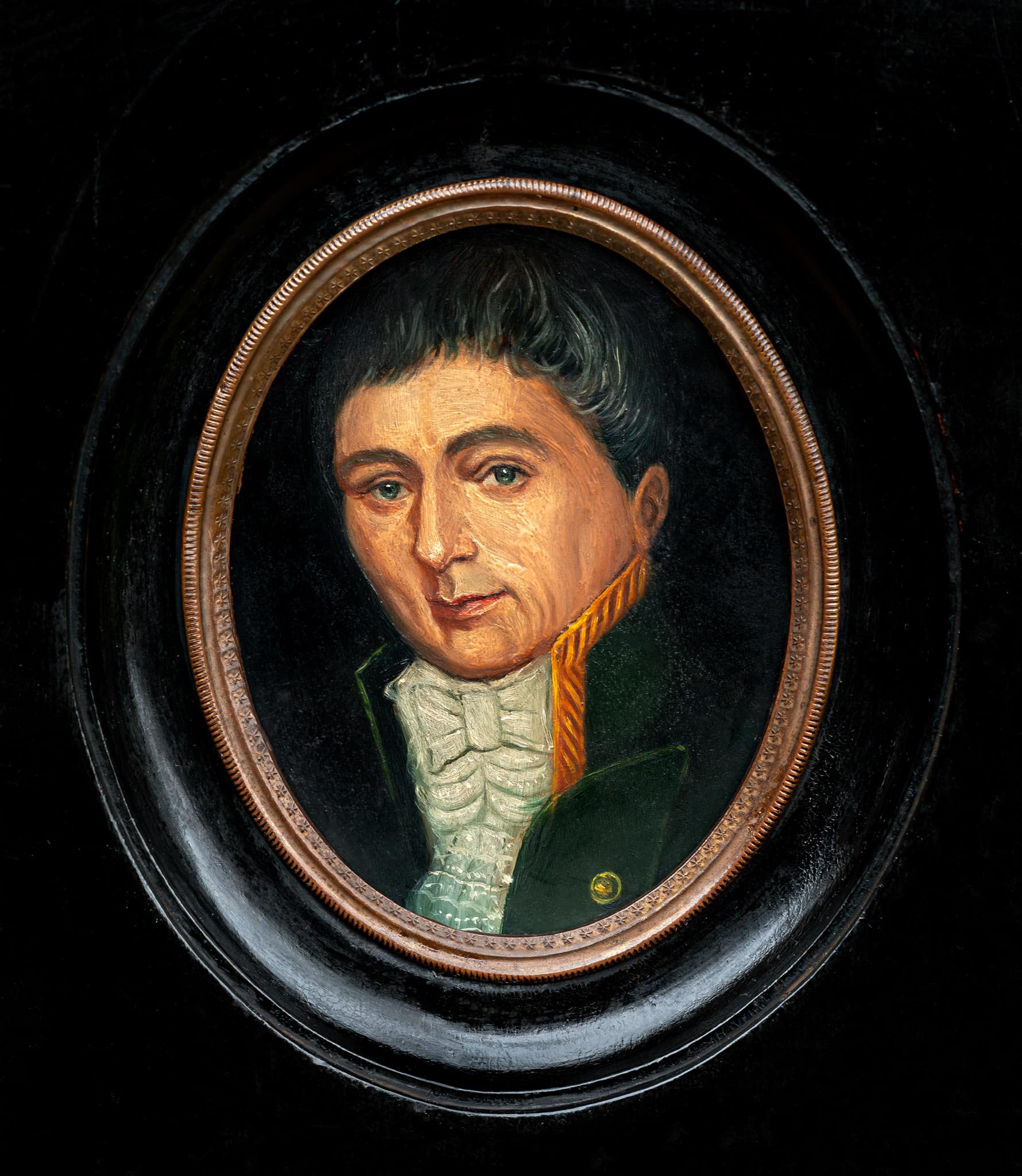
- Hipólito Unanue, 1814-16

Personal details
- Born: August 13, 1755 Arica, Viceroyalty of Peru, Spanish Empire
- Died: July 15, 1833 (aged 77) San Vicente de Cañete, Peru
- Profession: Medical doctor, naturalist, meteorologist, professor

José Hipólito Unanue y Pavón (August 13, 1755–July 15, 1833) was a Peruvian medical doctor, naturalist, meteorologist, cosmographer, the first Minister of Finance of Peru, Minister of Foreign Affairs, Protomédico (equivalent to Minister of health combining with head of "Escuela de Medicina del Peru"), university professor, founder of the San Fernando Medical School (now the Medicine faculty of San Marcos University), representative of Arequipa in the Cortes of Cádiz, President of the Junta de Gobierno (highest executive power in the Peruvian government at that time), Protector of the province of Arequipa (during the Spanish Empire), independence precursor and a Peruvian politician, active in politics in the early years after independence. He served as the President of the Congress from 1822 to 1823.

== Early life ==
Hipólito Unanue was born in Arica on August 13, 1755, as the son of Antonio Unánue de Montalivert and Manuela Pavón y Salgado, both from creole families. He studied philosophy and law in a seminary in Arequipa. In 1777, Unanue moved to Lima to study natural sciences. He studied in Universidad Nacional Mayor de San Marcos where he received his bachelor's degree in 1783, graduated in 1786 and became a professor at the same university, establishing his name as an eminent physician. He was one of the founders of Sociedad Académica de Amantes del País in 1790.

Unanue was Minister of Finance of Peru three times: 1821-1823, 1823-1824 and 1824-1825. His contributions to Peruvian science were "largely forgotten," during the turbulent period of Peruvian independence.

== See also ==
- Spanish American Enlightenment
