= Chumaichada =

Peruvian dance

La Chumaichada is a typical dance from the Amazonas Region, Peru. It is particularly associated with Chachapoyas.

The music is likely of indigenous origin. but the choreography has a French origin, stemming from "Los lanceros" (The lancers) - a dance which was imported into Chachapoyas by the bishop of the diocese at that time, monsignor Emilio Lissón, of French origin.
