= Señor de Burgos Church, Amazonas =

Coordinates: 6.2298°S 77.8670°W

Señor de Burgos Church
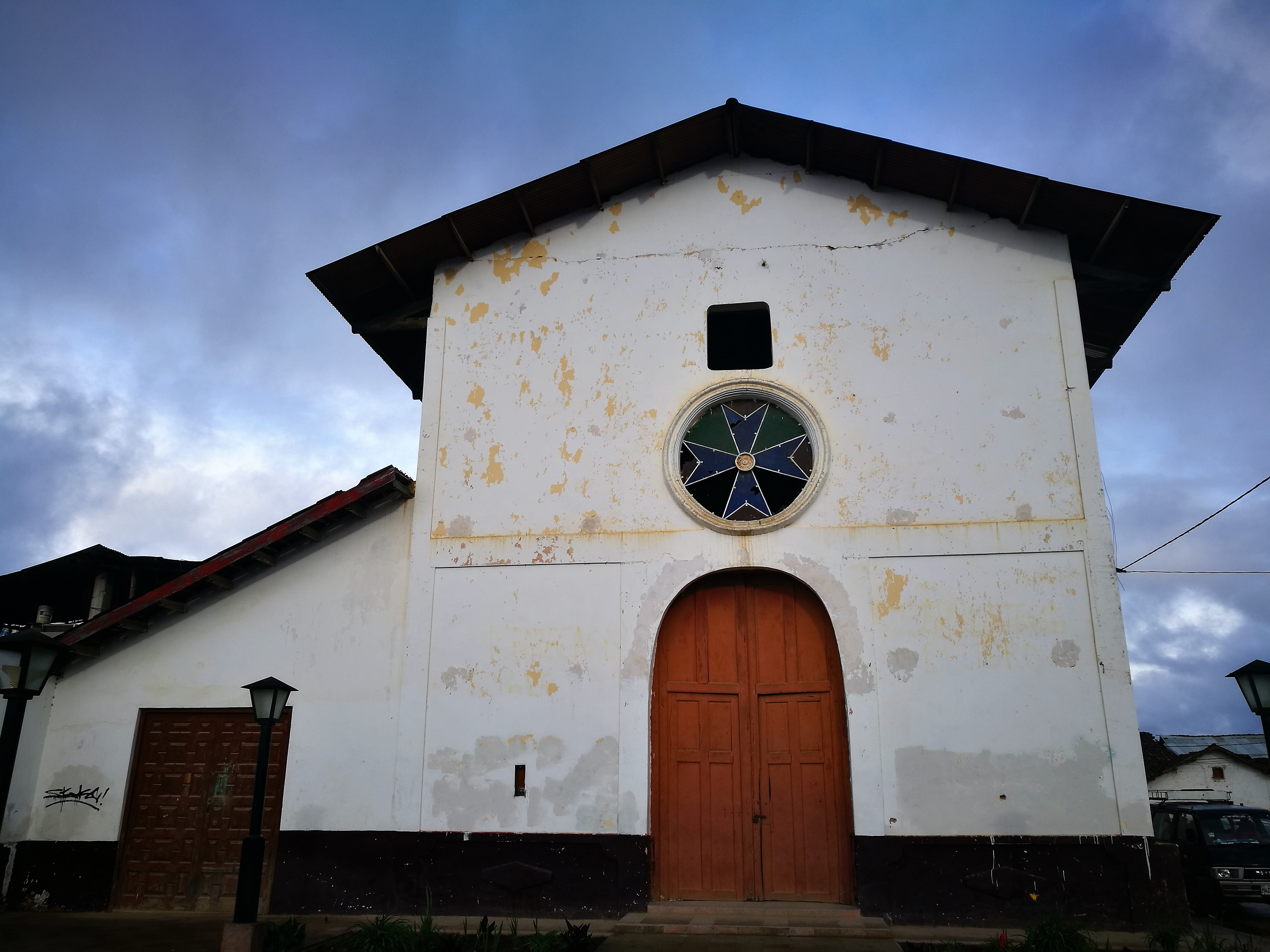
- Señor de Burgos Church
- Location: Chachapoyas
- Country: Peru
- Denomination: Roman Catholic Church

The Señor de Burgos Church is a 17th-century adobe built church located on Plaza de la Independencia in the La Laguna quarter of Chachapoyas, capital of the Amazonas Region of Peru. Señor de Burgos is a venerated local figure to whom is attributed a number of miracles. During its history, it has suffered as the result of several earthquakes, notably in 1929, 1970 and 2005, which have cause changes to the building's structure and appearance.

== Impact of the 2005 earthquake ==
When the North of Peru was struck by an earthquake measuring 7.5 on the moment magnitude scale on the evening of September 25, 2005, the quarter of Chachapoyas was situated quite near to the epicenter. The earthquake damaged the church severely, forcing it to close for worship for the first time in its history. All images, including that of the Señor de Burgos were removed to the house of Doña Hilda Rodríguez Eguren, and the equipment and pews have also taken for safety to a nearby building. It is hoped that the ancient tower and frontage can be preserved, although the rest of the church will probably have to undergo a costly demolition and rebuilding.

== Related ==
- Chachapoyas, Peru
