= Los pastorcillos de Navidad =

Christmas tradition

Los pastorcillos de Navidad is a Christmas tradition unique to the Amazonas region of Peru, in which the children of the city play a main role.

At dusk on December 24, choirs of children dressed as shepherd walk around the town singing Christmas Carols. The children form two columns with the shepherds and the "Three Kings", in the middle.

The girls are dressed with a skirt adorned with colorful ribbons, a blouse with spangles and a handkerchief crossing their breast, as well as a hat with shining adornments and ribbons that hang backwards. All the children shake tambourines and timbrels to the rhythm of a dance played by a live band. At the end, four girls dressed in white carry an image of the Child Jesus to the church, and put it in the manger between José and Maria. Later they continue with the singings and dances during "the vigil", until the Holy Mass starts.
