= Santa Ana Church, Amazonas =

Church in Amazonas, Peru

Coordinates: 6.2263°S 77.8738°W

Santa Ana Church (Spanish: Iglesia de Santa Ana de Chachapoyas)is located in the first block of Chincha Alta street, opposite to the Saint Ana's square. It was the first church of its type, constructed by the Spanish in 1569 in what is now the Department of Amazonas, Peru. In 2009, the church, which had been abandoned for years, was inaugurated as an ethnohistorical-religious museum.
