= Rodríguez de Mendoza province =

Coordinates: 6.315938°S 77.538016°W

Rodríguez de Mendoza Province
- Province
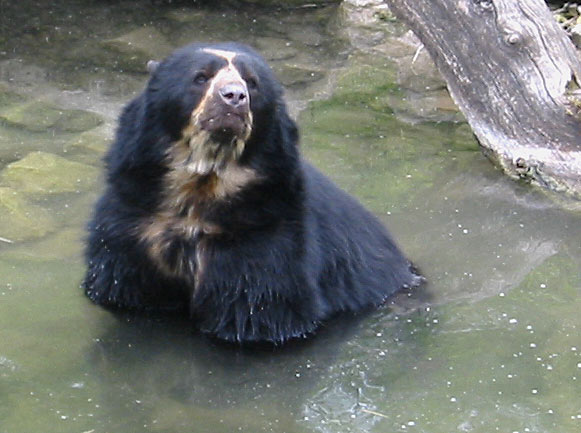
- The spectacled bear in Rodríguez de Mendoza, Peru

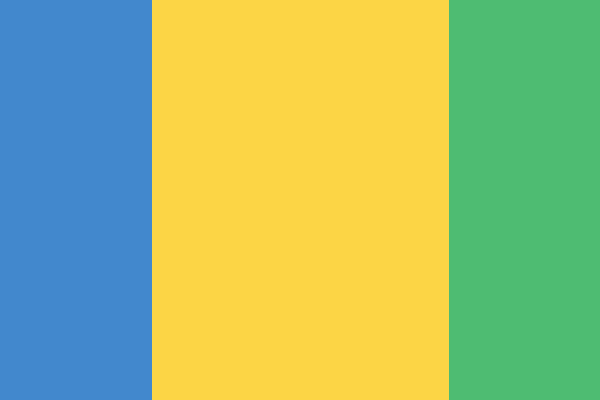
- Flag

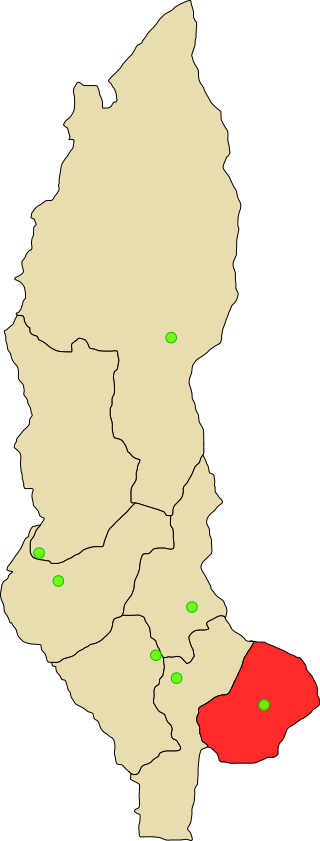
- Location of Rodríguez de Mendoza in the Amazonas Region
- Country: Peru
- Region: Amazonas
- Founded: October 31, 1932
- Capital: Mendoza

Government
  - Mayor: Helder Rodríguez Zelada

Area
  - Total: 2,359 km^{2} (911 sq mi)

Population
  - Total: 29,998
  - Density: 12.72/km^{2} (32.94/sq mi)
- UBIGEO: 0106

Rodríguez de Mendoza is a province of the Amazonas Region, Peru. It is located in the southeast part of the department of Amazonas. It borders on the west with the province of Chachapoyas and on the north, east and south with the department of San Martin. It was created by law 7626 on October 31, 1932, and its capital is Mendoza.

The province has importance because of the fertility of its soils, its climate and the large rivers that pass through its territory. Between these rivers we have San Antonio, Aiña, Pachca, Omia and Shocol or Milpuc. In its extensive tropical forests, there are spectacled bears and one variety of hummingbird (Loddigesia mirabilis).

== Political division ==
Rodríguez de Mendoza is divided into twelve districts, which are:

| District | Mayor |
|---|---|
| Chirimoto | Teófilo Izquierdo León |
| Cochamal | José Fausto López Tuesta |
| Huambo | Nehemías López Aguilar |
| Limabamba | Alinson Riva Novoa |
| Longar | Amando López Muñoz |
| Mariscal Benavides | Nilser Tafur Peláez |
| Milpuc | Obed Portocarrero Portocarrero |
| Omia | Javier Del Águila Tafur |
| San Nicolás | Helder Rodríguez Zelada |
| Santa Rosa | José Nérido Arbildo Aguilar |
| Totora | Julio César Fernández Portocarrero |
| Vista Alegre | Milder Rojas Campos |
