= Bagua District =

Coordinates: 5°46′48″S 78°26′24″W

Bagua
- District
- Interactive map of Bagua
- Country: Peru
- Region: Amazonas
- Province: Bagua
- Founded: April 26, 2008
- Capital: Bagua

Government
  - Mayor: Luis Sacarias Nuñez Teran
- Time zone: UTC-5 (PET)
- UBIGEO: 010201

Bagua District is one of six districts of the province Bagua in Peru. The district was created by law on April 26, 2008.
