= Milpuc District =

Coordinates: 6°28′01″S 77°22′59″W

Milpuc
- District
- Interactive map of Milpuc
- Country: Peru
- Region: Amazonas
- Province: Rodríguez de Mendoza
- Founded: October 31, 1932
- Capital: Milpuc

Government
  - Mayor: Obed Portocarrero Portocarrero

Area
  - Total: 26.8 km^{2} (10.3 sq mi)
- Elevation: 1,552 m (5,092 ft)

Population (2017)
  - Total: 453
  - Density: 16.9/km^{2} (43.8/sq mi)
- Time zone: UTC-5 (PET)
- UBIGEO: 010608

Milpuc District is one of twelve districts of the province Rodríguez de Mendoza in Peru.
