= Purtumute =

Purtumute is a typical dish of the Amazonas Region in Peru.

The dish is prepared by stewing several types of beans and corn, seasoned made with coriander.

A variant is chipasmute, prepared not with stewed corn grains but with sweetcorn grains, mixed with green beans and seasoned with coriander and sometimes peanuts. This dish can be accompanied with ground pepper mixed with cheese.
