= Huambo District, Rodríguez de Mendoza =

Coordinates: 6°20′10″S 77°27′58″W

Huambo
- District
- Interactive map of Huambo
- Country: Peru
- Region: Amazonas
- Province: Rodríguez de Mendoza
- Founded: February 5, 1875
- Capital: Huambo

Government
  - Mayor: Nehemías López Aguilar

Area
  - Total: 99.56 km^{2} (38.44 sq mi)
- Elevation: 1,630 m (5,350 ft)

Population (2017)
  - Total: 2,620
  - Density: 26.3/km^{2} (68.2/sq mi)
- Time zone: UTC-5 (PET)
- UBIGEO: 010604

Huambo District is one of twelve districts of the province of Rodríguez de Mendoza in Peru.
