= Pongo (geography) =

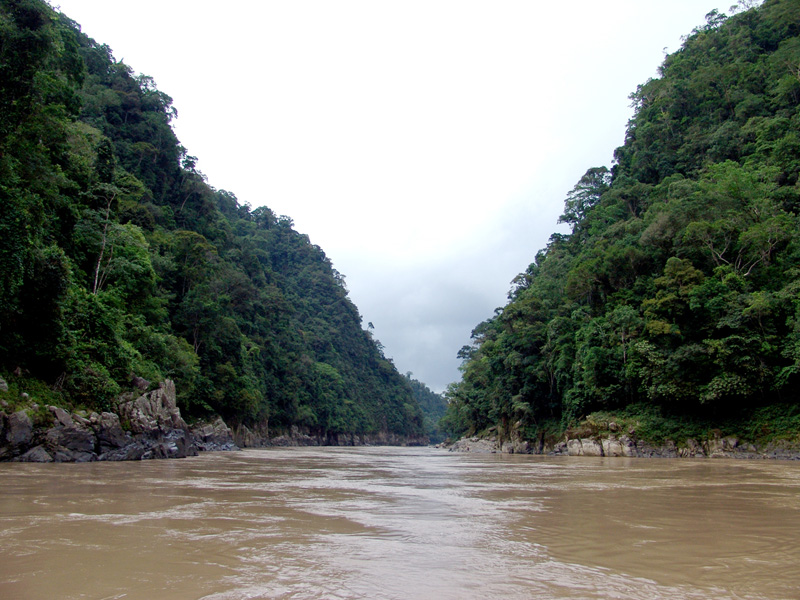

A pongo is a term used in the Peruvian Spanish dialect for 'canyon'. It is derived from either Quechua puncu or the Aymara ponco, meaning 'door' or 'gate.'

See:

- The Pongo de Manseriche: a gorge in northwest Peru where the Marañón River runs. The Marañón River has 35 miles of pongo before it joins the Amazon River.
- The Pongo de Mainique: the most dangerous whitewater pass on the Urubamba River.
- The Pongo de Aguirre : formed by the Hualaga river when it crosses a part of the Andes.
