= Centro Amazónico de Antropología y Aplicación Práctica =

Peruvian non-profit association

Amazonian Centre for Anthropology and Practical Application
- Centro Amazónico de Antropología y Aplicación Práctica
- Abbreviation: CAAAP
- Formation: 1974; 52 years ago
- Type: Nonprofit
- Headquarters: Magdalena del Mar, Lima
- Director: Manuel Cornejo Chaparro
- Website: www.caaap.org.pe
- Formerly called: Centro Amazónico de Antropología y Acción Pastoral

The Amazonian Centre for Anthropology and Practical Application (Spanish: Centro Amazónico de Antropología y Aplicación Práctica; CAAAP), formerly known as the Amazonian Centre for Anthropology and Pastoral Action (Spanish: Centro Amazónico de Antropología y Acción Pastoral), is a Peruvian non-profit association established in 1974 by eight Roman Catholic bishops of the Peruvian Amazon as an institution for the service of the area's marginalised population.

Anthropology professors from the Pontifical Catholic University of Peru have been involved in the organisation over the years, which aims to promote the study of people in the Peruvian Amazon. Though it is known more for this research than for evangelism, it is affiliated with the church and one goal of its research is to facilitate evangelism.
