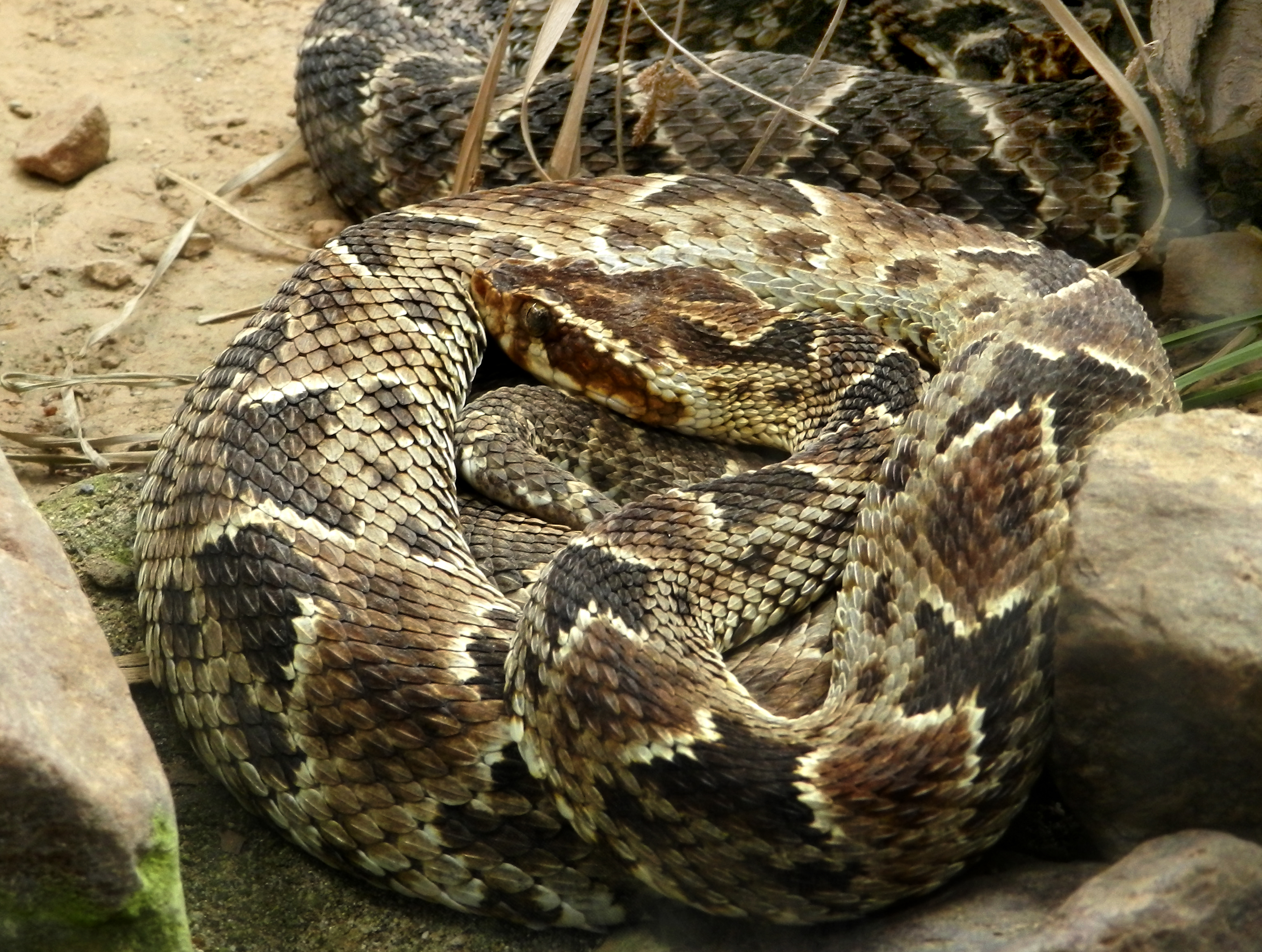

Scientific classification
- Kingdom: Animalia
- Phylum: Chordata
- Class: Reptilia
- Order: Squamata
- Suborder: Serpentes
- Family: Viperidae
- Genus: Bothrops
- Species: B. barnetti

Binomial name
- Bothrops barnetti Parker, 1938

Synonyms
- Bothrops barnetti Parker, 1938; Trimeresurus barnetti — K.P. Schmidt & W. Walker, 1943; Bothrops barnetti — J. Peters & Orejas-Miranda, 1970

= Bothrops barnetti =

Species of snake

Bothrops barnetti, also known commonly as Barnett's lancehead and Barnett's pit viper, is a species of venomous snake, a pit viper in the subfamily Crotalinae of the family Viperidae. The species is endemic to Peru. There are no subspecies that are recognized as being valid.

== Etymology ==
The specific name, barnetti, is in honor of Burgess Barnett (1888–1944), who collected the holotype and paratypes. Dr. Barnett was Curator of Reptiles at the London Zoo (1932–1937) and Superintendent of the Rangoon Zoological Gardens (1938–1944).

== Description ==
Bothrops barnetti is patterned in white and black triangles. Males usually grow to 120 cm (47 inches) in total length (tail included) and are stocky, whereas females are quite smaller and thinner.

== Common names ==
English common names for Bothrops barnetti are Barnett's lancehead and Barnett's pit viper. In Peru it is referred to as cascabel, cascabel falso, macanche, sancarranca, and zancarranca.

== Geographic range ==
Bothrops barnetti is found along the Pacific coast of northern Peru. It occurs at low elevations in arid, tropical scrub.

The type locality given is "from the mouths of Quebradas Honda and Perines, between Lobitos and Talara, northern Peru".

== Reproduction ==
Bothrops barnetti is viviparous.
