= Mercurio Peruano =

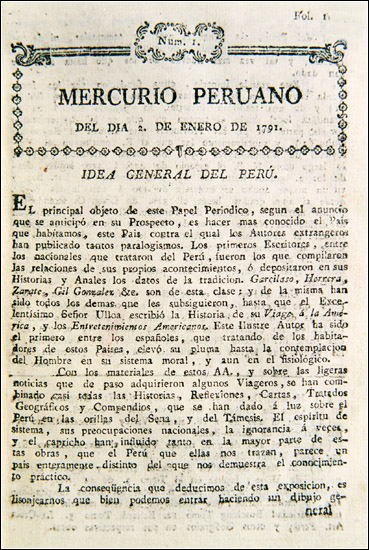
Mercurio Peruano

Mercurio Peruano was a newspaper published in Peru between 1790 and 1795. It was the first scientific paper in the country. Over 400 editions were published. It was created by a circle of young intellectuals of the Peruvian Enlightenment to cover diverse subject matter, focused on Peru and Peruvians.

The Carta sobre los maricones was published in the Mercurio Peruano on 27 November 1791.

== See also ==
- List of newspapers in Peru
- Media of Peru
