= Plain of Bagua =

Coordinates: 5.826°S 77.949°W

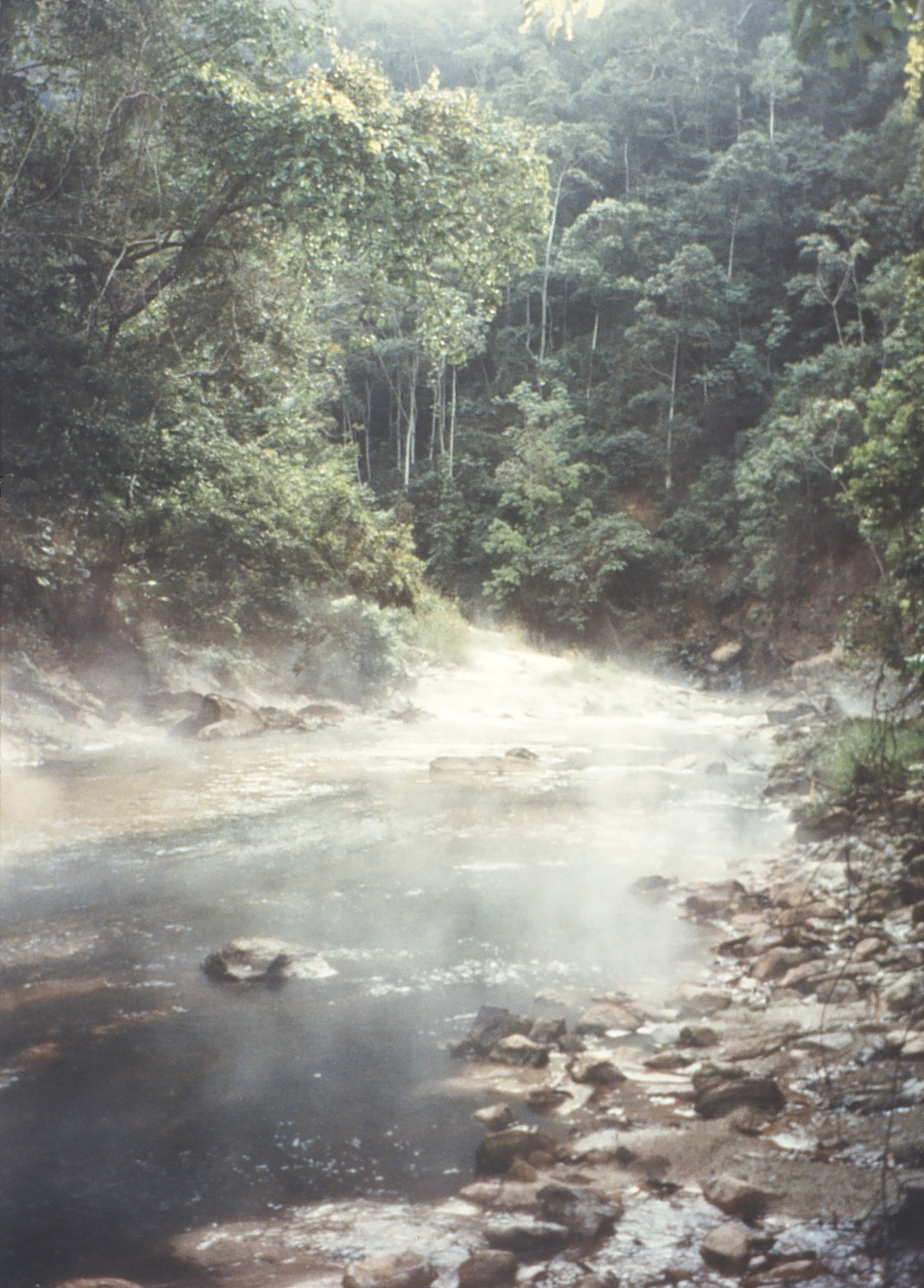
Hot springs in the Rupa-Rupa Region

The Plain of Bagua, also known as the Bagua Plain, is a geographical feature within the larger Bagua Basin. The basin is approximately 400 km south of the transition between the Central Andes and Northern Andes. The plain is located in the Amazonas department of Peru.

The Bagua Basin, which encompasses the Plain of Bagua, contains a rich sedimentary record dating from the Campanian period to the Pleistocene epoch. This geological feature makes the area particularly interesting for researchers studying the region's paleoenvironmental history.
