= La Peca District =

Coordinates: 5°36′40″S 78°26′06″W

La Peca
- District
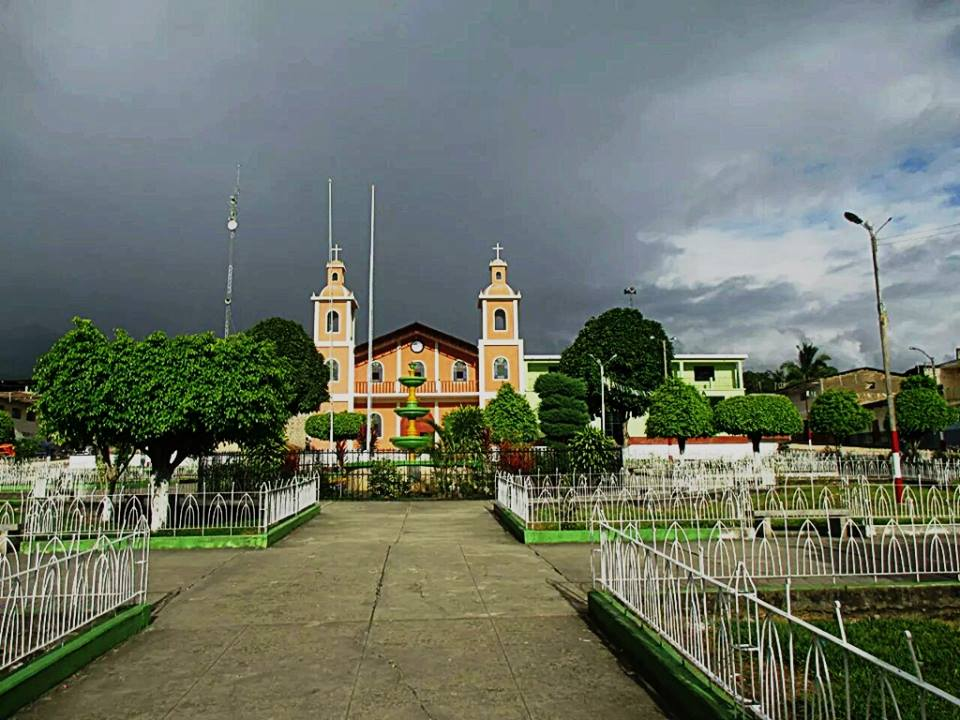
- La Peca in 2015
- Interactive map of La Peca
- Country: Peru
- Region: Amazonas
- Province: Bagua
- Capital: Bagua

Area
  - Total: 291.39 km^{2} (112.51 sq mi)

Population (2005 census)
  - Total: 30,883
  - Density: 105.99/km^{2} (274.50/sq mi)
- Time zone: UTC-5 (PET)

La Peca District is a district in the Bagua Province, Amazonas Region, Peru.
