= Sociedad Académica de Amantes del País =

Sociedad Académica de Amantes del País (Academic Society of Lovers of the Country) was a society established in Lima, Peru in 1790 for the purpose of discussing national matters.

Joseph Rossi founded the group, which was shaped by José Maria Egaña, Demetrio Guasque, Hipólito Unanue and Jacinto Calero y Moreira. Together with two acquaintances under the pseudonyms of Mindirido and Agelasto and three ladies known as Dorálice, Florida and Egeria, they had previously formed the Society Harmonica to discuss literature and the public news. Another notable member of the Society was Doctor Hipólito Unanue.

The members of the Academic Society of Lovers of the Country decided to publish the topics of these conversations. They created the Peruvian Mercury of History, Literature and Public News newspaper. They added other members to help with the effort. They published the first issue on 2 January 1791, for 220 subscribers. The number peaked at 398. The paper competed with the Newspaper of Lima and after June 12, 1791, with the Critical Weekly, published by Spanish Franciscan Brother Antonio Olavarrieta. This weekly paper published sixteen issues.

The biggest contribution of the Peruvian Mercury was that for the first time since the arrival of the Spanish in Peru, the concept of Peru as a nation was established.

== Publications ==
- Grupo Historiem (Lima, Peru) (2001). Ensayos : sociedad, religiosidad y arte en el Perú (in Spanish). Lima, Peru: Universidad Nacional Federico Villarreal, Facultad Humanidades, Escuela Profesional de Historia. OCLC 51111784.

== See also ==
- José Baquíjano
- El Mercurio Peruano (in German)
