= Bagua province =

Bagua
- Province
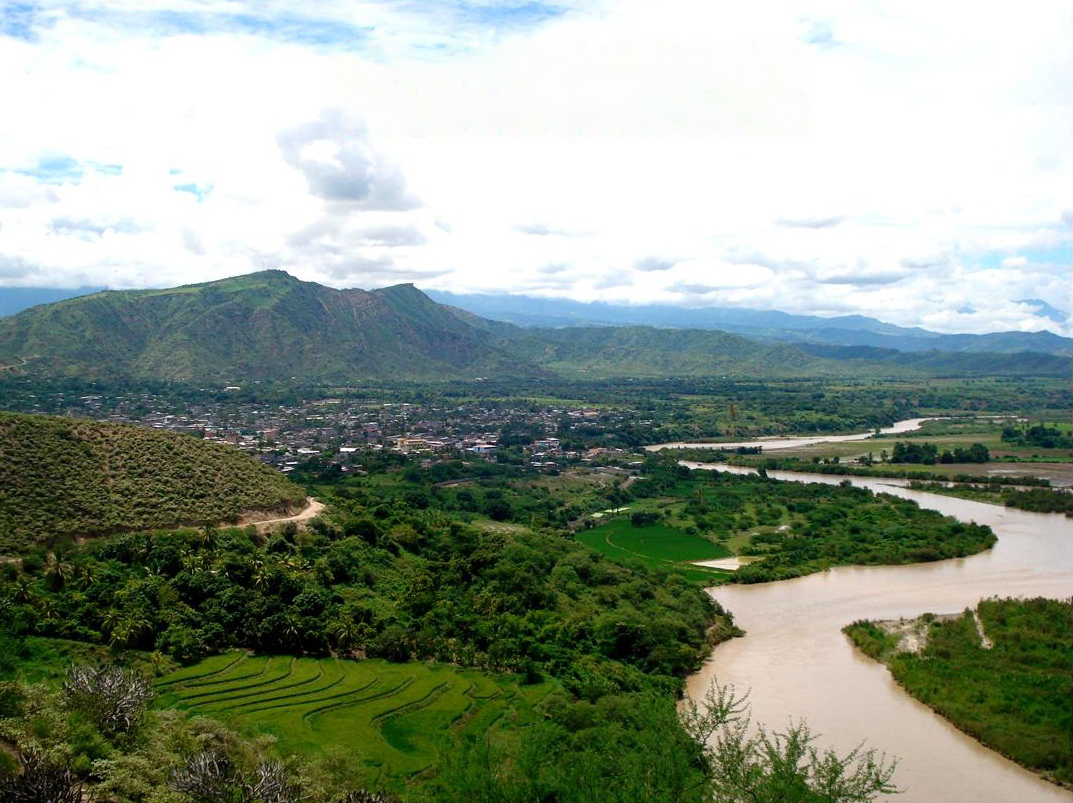
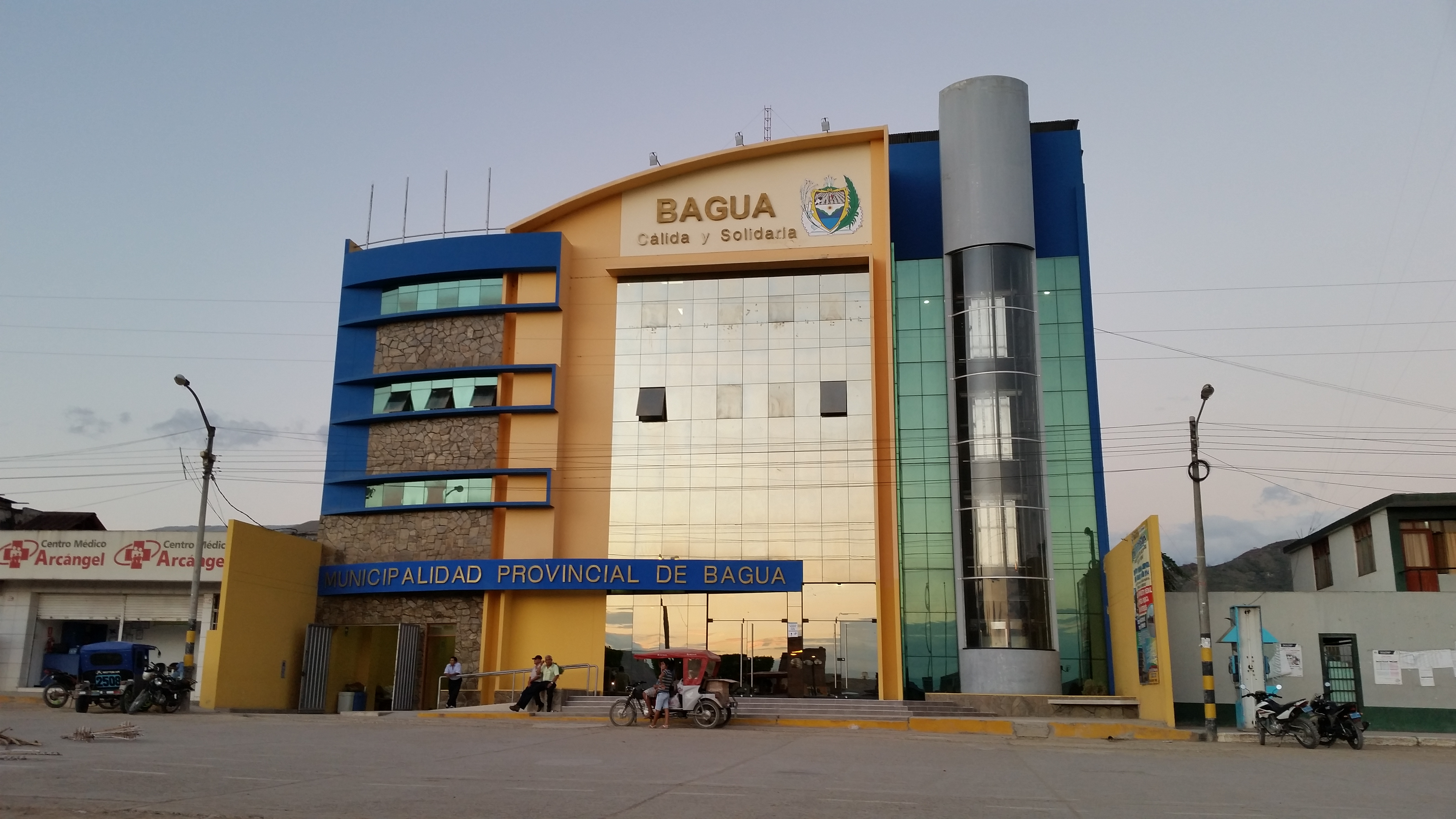
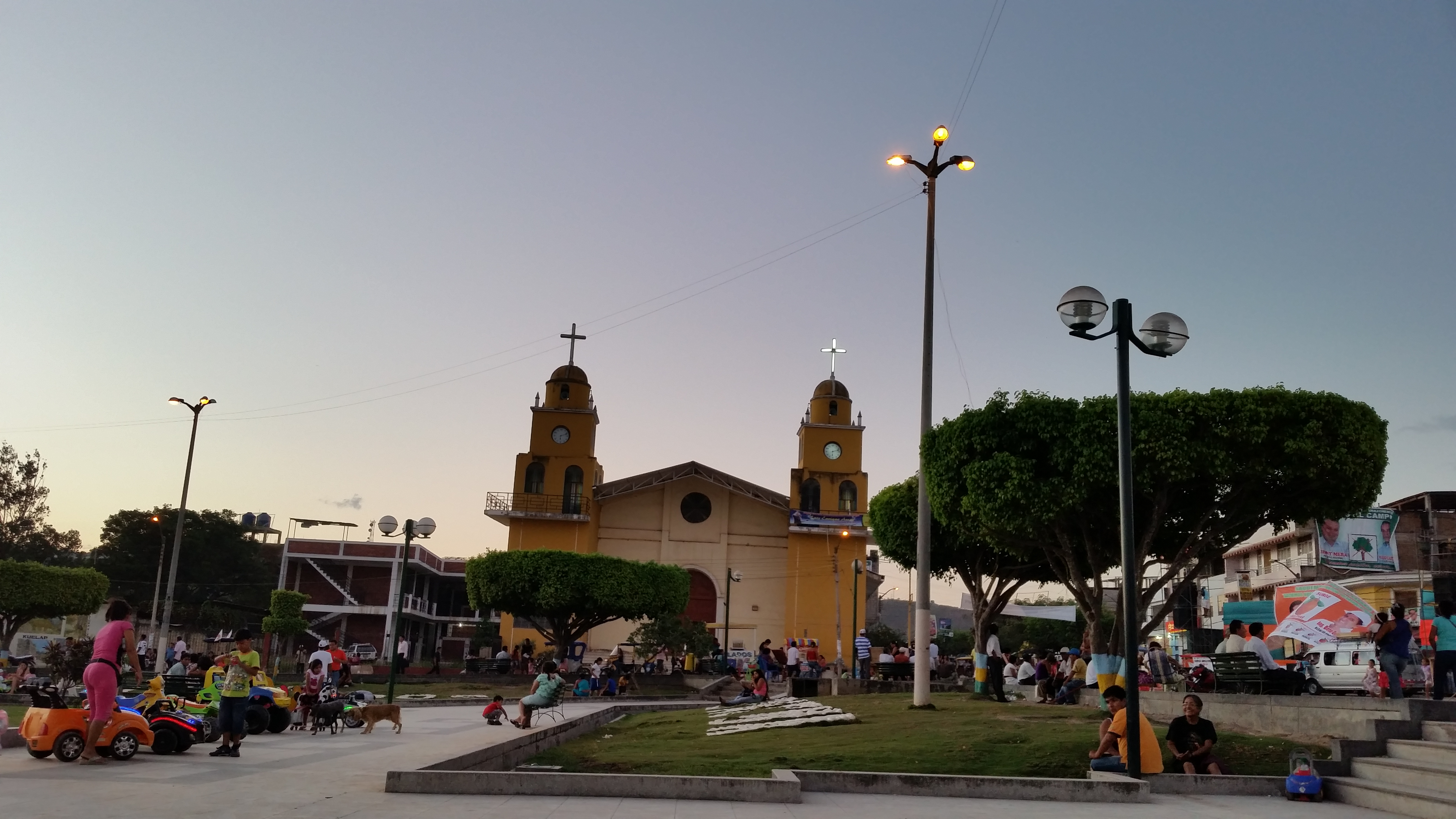

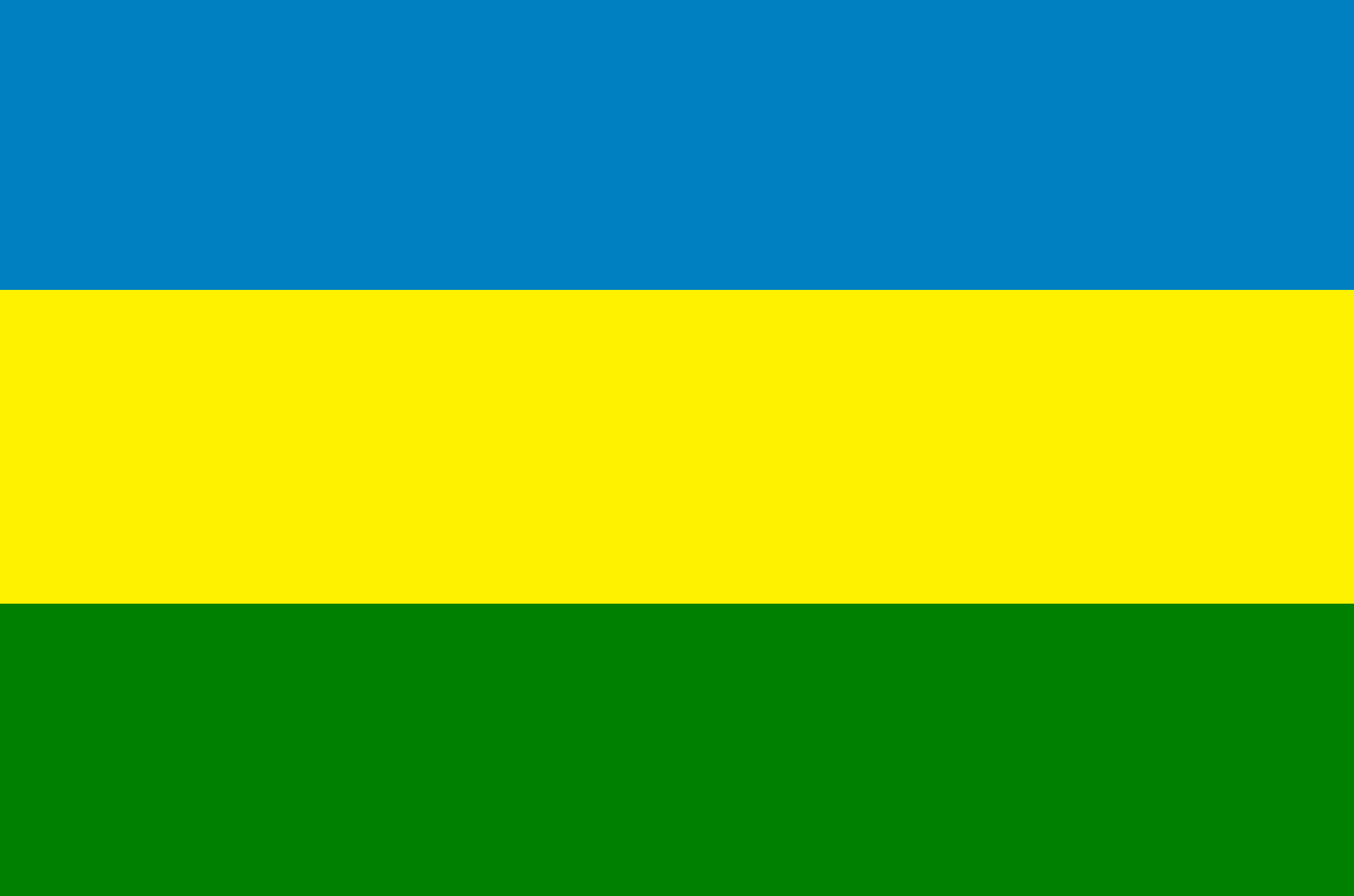
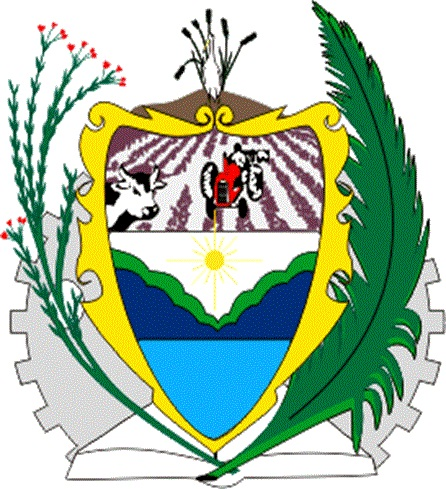
- Flag Coat of arms

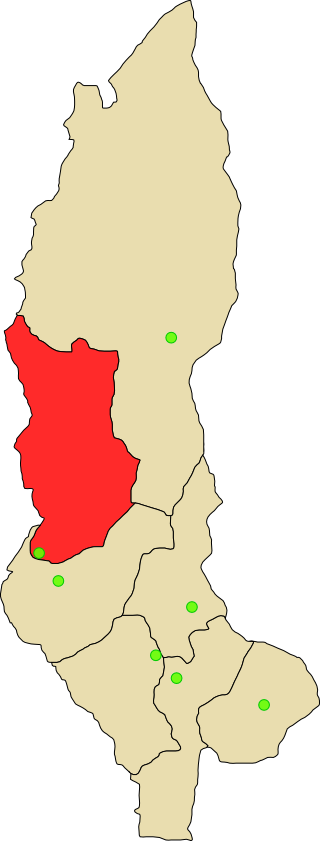
- Location of Bagua in the Amazonas Region
- Coordinates: 5°38′19″S 78°31′52″W
- Country: Peru
- Region: Amazonas
- Capital: Bagua

Area
  - Total: 5,745.72 km^{2} (2,218.43 sq mi)

Population
  - Total: 74,100
  - Density: 12.9/km^{2} (33.4/sq mi)
- Website: gob.pe/munibagua

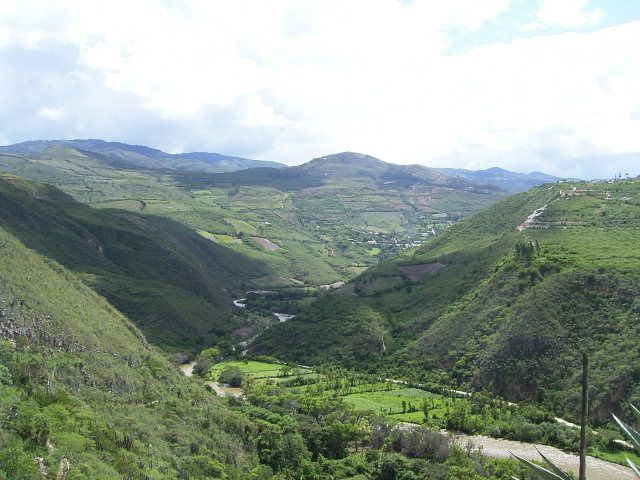
The Utcubamba River in the Amazonas Region, Peru

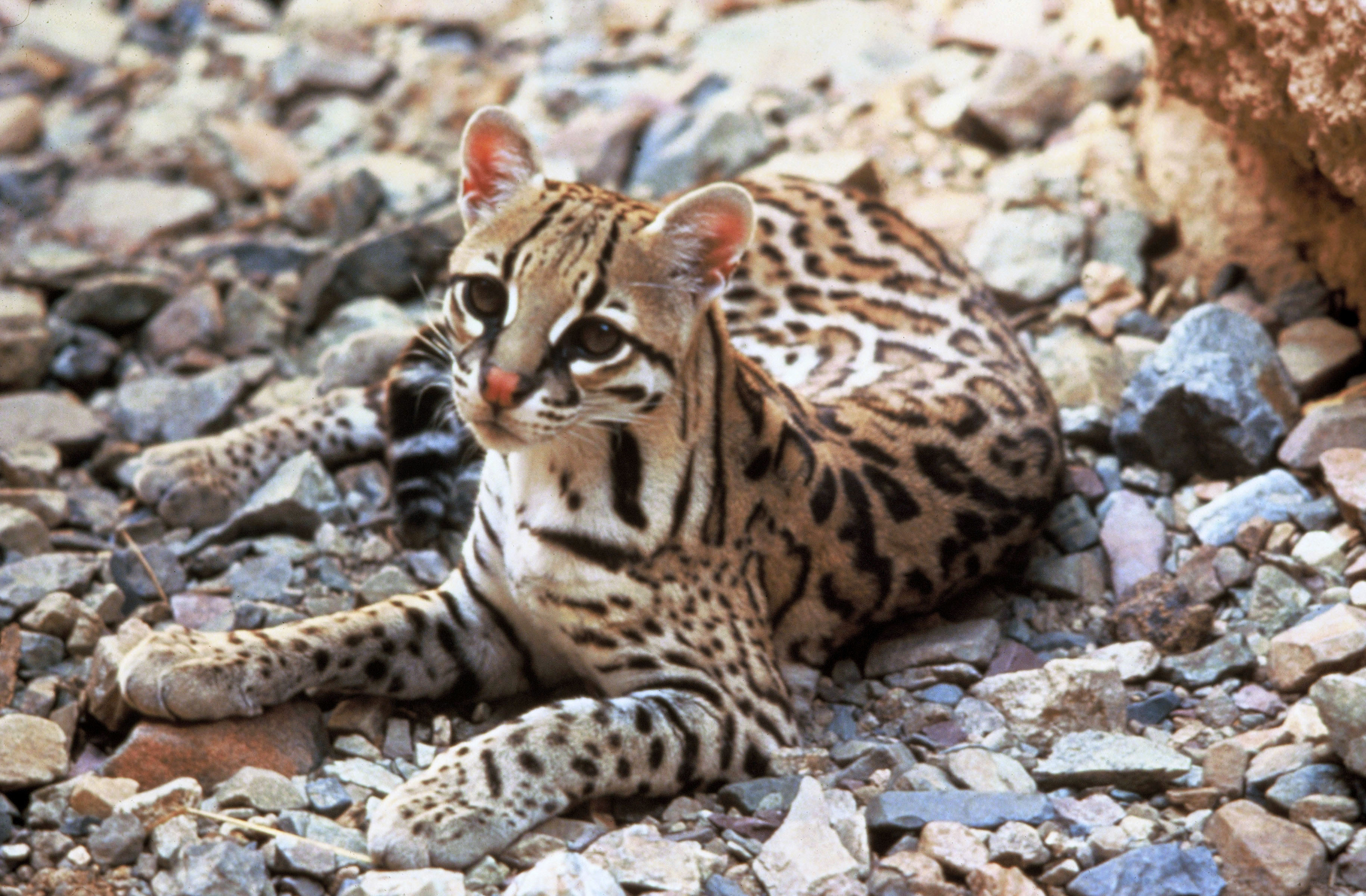
Ocelot, one of the fauna species in Bagua

Bagua is a province of the Amazonas Region in Peru. It is located in the north and central part of the department of Amazonas. The region is known for its rugged terrain. It is also cut by deep gorges that have been formed by the important rivers that cross this province, as well as their numerous tributaries.

Bagua's terrain is varied in height, from hills of 400 m. along the banks of the Marañón and Santiago rivers, to up to 2,500 m. in the mountain zone of the south.

The Marañón river runs from south-west to north-east across the province and is one of the principal rivers in the Peruvian Amazon. The Chiriaco or Imaza river runs from the south to the northeast. The Nieva river runs from southeast to north, and the Utcubamba from the east to the northwest.

The city of Bagua is located on a natural plateau rising from the right shore of the Utcubamba river. All the houses of the western part of the city have a view of the river waters.

Numerous species of animals are typical of the zone: huanganas, pumas, anteaters, ocelots, cashpaicuros, and armadillos. There are also numerous snakes such as the macanche, colambo, uyurechonte, cascabel, shushupe, etc. The natives hunted them for food.

These species attract tourists for hunting, which is regulated to preserve the species. For collectors, the quantity and variety of butterflies is a major attraction principally in the wooded zone of the district.

== Political division ==
Bagua is divided into six districts, which are:

District	Mayor
Aramango	César Córdova Gonzáles
Bagua	Luis Sacarias Nuñez Teran
Copallín	Enilo Cruz Cruz
El Parco	Absalón Cardozo Díaz
Imaza	Sergio Suwikái Tatse
La Peca	Alfonso Mendoza Lingán

== 'El Baguazo' ==
In August 2008 and June 2009, Bagua suffered social unrest and the occupation of road infrastructure by indigenous communities protesting against new laws that would allow oil and mining companies to enter indigenous territories without seeking the consent or consulting with local communities. Indigenous communities complained that some 70% of the Peruvian Amazon would be leased for oil and gas exploration, putting at risk their own lives and the environment. In other areas affected by oil drilling and the dumping of toxic waste, local communities in Peru have already experienced severe environmental and health damage. Congress responded in 2008 by repealing two of the decrees but took no action on others.

In 2009, President Alan García signed new decrees, claiming they were necessary to implement the recently concluded Free Trade Agreement with the United States of America. In April 2009, protesters established a roadblock in the region preventing access to an oil company site. On 5 June, the government declared a state of emergency and ordered the police to break out of the 59-day roadblock. The police intervention on 6 June resulted in a serious armed clash between the parties, resulting in 5 civilians being killed, with 5 natives, 23 policemen, and another 89 people wounded.

The indigenous population in Bagua and some news reports dispute the government version, stating that the death toll was in the hundreds and that the military threw bodies of the indigenous people into the river in an attempt to hide them. Black vultures were reported seen around a corpse in the river. Local news correspondents confirmed that the government's version 'did not adjust to the truth'.

== Places of interest ==
- Cordillera de Colán Reserved Zone

== See also ==
- 2009 Peruvian political crisis
- 2008 Peru oil scandal
- Llaqtan
- Nazareth, Peru
