= Department of Amazonas (Peru) =

Department of Peru

Amazonas
- Department
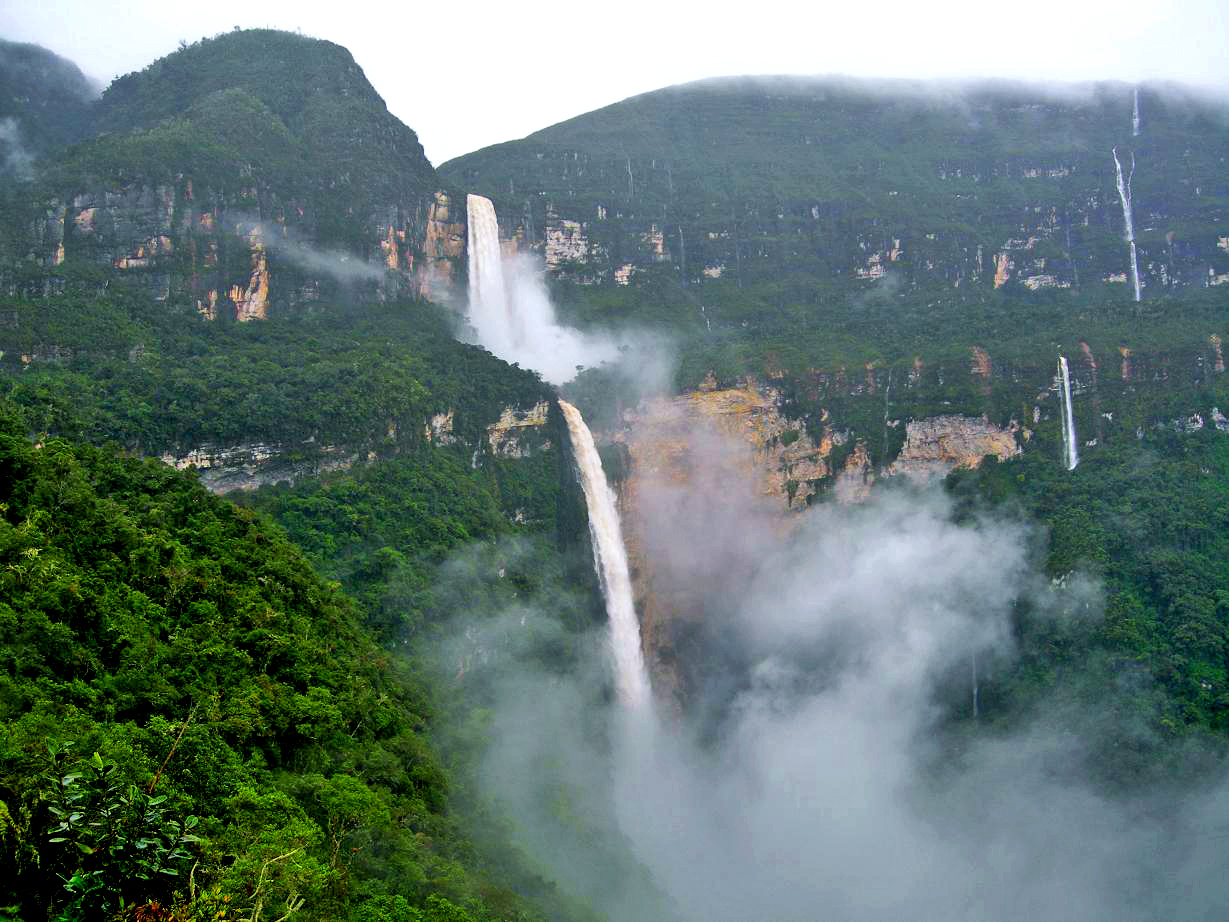
- Gocta Falls in the Amazon rainforest

- Flag Coat of arms

- Location of Amazonas within Peru
- Coordinates: 6.22°S 77.85°W
- Country: Peru
- Capital: Chachapoyas
- Largest city: Bagua Grande
- Provinces: List: Bagua; Bongará; Chachapoyas; Condorcanqui; Luya; Rodríguez de Mendoza; Utcubamba

Government
  - Type: Regional Government
  - Governor: Gilmer Horna Corrales
  - Senator: José Arista Arbildo (FP)

Area
  - Total: 39,249.13 km^{2} (15,154.17 sq mi)
- Elevation (Capital): 2,334 m (7,657 ft)

Population (2025)
  - Total: 467,845
  - Density: 11.9199/km^{2} (30.8724/sq mi)
- Demonym: amazonense
- UBIGEO: 01
- Dialing code: 041
- ISO 3166 code: PE-AMA
- Principal resources: Coffee, rice, fruits, wood and cebu cattle.
- Website: www.regionamazonas.gob.pe

Amazonas (Spanish pronunciation: [amaˈsonas]) is a department of Peru. Located in the country's north, it is bordered by Ecuador on the north and west, Cajamarca on the west, La Libertad on the south, and Loreto and San Martín on the east. It is administered by a regional government. Its capital is the city of Chachapoyas.

With a landscape of steep river gorges and mountains, Amazonas is the location of Kuelap, a huge stone fortress enclosing more than 400 stone structures; it was built on a mountain about 3,000 meters high, starting about 500 AD and was occupied to the mid-16th century. It is one of Peru's major archeological sites.

According to the adjusted 2025 census results, around 467,800 people lived in Amazonas.

== Etymology ==
The department is named after the Amazon rainforest, where it's located. The Chachapoya culture were the region's main inhabitants before the arrival of the Spanish. The meaning of the word chachapoya is unknown. If it is in the Quechua language, it may have been derived from sacha-p-collas, meaning the "colla people who live in the woods" (sacha = wild p = of the colla = nation in which Aimara is spoken).

== History ==
The northeast of Peru has been inhabited since prehistory. Remains from this period have been found, such as the cave paintings of hunter-gatherers in Chiñuña-Yamón and Limones-Calpón in Utcubamba, dating back to six to seven thousand years ago. Before the arrival of the Spanish, the area was inhabited by pre-Columbian cultures, whose history is still precariously evaluated and spread.

=== Pre-Columbian period ===
Notable pre-Columbian cultures of the area included the Chachapoya and Wari (Huari), both preceding the Inca Empire by 500 years. Similar to the Incas, the Wari also expanded across more territories than their other pre-Inca neighbors to the South, the Moche and Chimú. The Huari are theorized to be the pioneers of terrace agriculture, a farming system suited to the topographical terrain of Peru that later would revolutionize European agriculture.

The Chachapoya people built the fortress of Kuélap during the 6th century. The largest stone complex in South America, it is located 3,000 meters above sea level, higher than Machu Picchu. These people strongly opposed the Incan conquest and repelled the first Inca attempts to incorporate the region to their empire in the 15th century. Other archaeological remains of this culture are the Sarcophagi of Carajía, Revash's mausoleums, the Tunnels of San Antonio, Congón (renamed as Vilaya), Olán, Purunllaqta (renamed as Monte Peruvia), Pajatén, etc.

=== Spanish period ===
The natives of the region received in a jubilant and cordial way the first Spaniards who reached the region. Their arrival had been expected thanks to the news that they had received from Cajamarca. Those people had told Francisco Pizarro that Chachapoyas was an excellent agricultural region where the people possessed a lot of gold and silver. The conquistador did not lose time and formed an expedition of 20 men, putting captain Alonso de Alvarado in charge of it, with the express order to found a Christian city at Chachapoyas. The chroniclers say that, when the Spanish arrived to the region, the Chachapoyas people gave big parties in their honor and gave them many rich gifts willingly, also numerous examples of appreciation, including showing some interest to become Christians.

Pizarro decided to send a second expedition, this time with instructions to take possession of the zone, delivering Alonso de Alvarado a provision so he would be able to found the city of San Juan de la Frontera de los Chachapoyas. But this time Pizarro's envoy met the bellicose resistance of a curaca called Huamán, whom they had to defeat before coming to their destination, where they founded the mentioned city on September 5, 1538. Its first church was built on the same year, followed by the churches of Santa Ana, San Lázaro and Señor de Burgos. The same day of Chachapoyas' foundation, the members of the first cabildo were elected, turning out to be designated the councillors Gómez de Alvarado, Alonso de Chávez, Gonzalo de Trujillo, Gonzalo de Guzmán, Luis Valera (father of the chronicler Blas Valera), Pedro Romero, Bernardino de Anaya and Francisco de Fuentes.

Alvarado had chosen a place called Jalca, which apparently did not have the demanded conditions. This was the reason why the location of the flaming city was changed several times. According to the papers of the epoch, the last time that a change was made was in 1544, but it is unknown when the city was established in its current place. A few years after its foundation, the prosperity of the region began to demonstrate itself in magnificent constructions in the city of Chachapoyas, with big courts, wide lounges and architectural characteristics adapted to the zone.

On April 17, 1549, the Spanish captain Diego Palomino arrived at the Chuquimayo (Chinchipe) River. From there, he set out to visit various regions in what are now the provinces of San Ignacio, Jaén, Utcubamba, and Bagua. After inspecting the lower Utcubamba Valley (both the right and left banks), he compiled a report of what he considered most important and subsequently sent the document to the King of Spain.

A refined religious feeling was one of the characteristics that distinguished the settlers of this region during the colonial period. In the same year of the foundation of Chachapoyas, the first church was built. Its first priest was Hernando Gutiérrez Palacios. Later the churches of Santa Ana, San Lázaro and Señor de Burgos were built.

Three religious convents were also established: San Francisco, La Merced and that of the betlehemitas. The majority of the persons who settled in Chachapoyas from the time of its foundation were people with nobility, but poor. They were living in a modest and worthily way and they devoted themselves to agriculture and mining. Many settlers achieved a loose economic position, keeping, nevertheless, the austerity of the customs that was one of the highlight points of Chachapoyas' social life.

With time the settlers were spreading to other zones of the region, such as Luya, city that was established in 1569 by the governor Lope García de Castro, ratified later in its administrative organization by the viceroy Francisco de Toledo. There, an agriculture of varied production and the upbringing of dairy, sheep and equine cattle, bloomed in the area. Saint Toribio de Mogrovejo made a visit to the locals at one point.

The partido of Chachapoyas (Spanish: Partido de Chachapoyas) was the form of administration under which the area operated from 1784 onwards. The partido was one of the seven subdivisions of the Intendancy of Trujillo, itself a subdivision of the Viceroyalty of Peru.

The inhabitants of Chachapoyas became involved in the movement for independence. In April 1821, helping the action of San Martin's liberating army, they ignored the Spanish authorities, exiling the subdelegate Francisco Baquedano and the bishop of Maynas Hipólito Sánchez, who were fighting openly against independence. The cleric Toribio Rodríguez de Mendoza was its most outstanding representative, encouraging the patriots of this era and signing the National Act of Independence. The military chief of Moyobamba, colonel José Matos, organized an army of 600 men, who confronted the patriots on June 6, 1821, in Higos Urco pampa. Although the latter lacked training, military knowledge or discipline, they faced the realistas determined to give their lives in defense of the proclaimed freedom. Matea Rimachi was a local renowned as a heroine of the Battle of Higos Urco.

Toribio Rodríguez de Mendoza, a professor, politician, philosopher and jurist, was one of the most important patriot leaders of the Amazonas. He signed the record of national independence in Lima. He was the rector of the Convictorio de San Carlos, member of the Sociedad Amantes del País (Lovers of the Country Society), founder and collaborator of the newspaper Mercurio Peruano, deputy of the Spanish Parliament and congressman of the first Constituent Congress, in which the majority of its members were his disciples.

=== Republican period ===
The department of Amazonas was created on November 21, 1832. Before this date, it had been administered as part of the department of La Libertad. The law, passed by the government of Agustín Gamarra, was the result of an initiative by José Modesto de la Vega and José Braulio del Camporredondo. The law defined the provinces of Pataz, Chachapoyas (created on February 12, 1821) and Maynas as part of its territory, also promoting their economic development through exonerations of rights in its commerce with Ecuador or Brazil.

In 1836, it was incorporated into North Peru, established after a civil war and made into a constituent country of the Peru–Bolivian Confederation two months later. The department continued to exist following the Confederation's dissolution in 1839. The following years saw the dismemberment of the department's territory: Pataz was returned to La Libertad in 1853, and Maynas was separated as its own political subdivision in 1853.

Chachapoyas remained as the department's lone province until 1861. New province were created in the following years: Luya was created on February 5, 1861, Bongará was created on December 26, 1870, Rodríguez de Mendoza was created on October 31, 1932, Bagua was created on September 1, 1941, and, in May 1984, two provinces were created: Condorcanqui (May 18) and Utcubamba (May 30).

=== Contemporary period ===
The area remained isolated for over a century due to its geography . Without highways, routes connecting to the city had to be done on horse, in long and painful caravans from the coast, or by the rivers from the region of the east. This situation continued until 1960, when highway connections arrived to Chachapoyas, although it had been already preceded by air transport. Later, during the last government of Manuel Prado Ugarteche, the highway that joins Chachapoyas with the big route of penetration Olmos-Marañon was inaugurated. With this, Amazonas was put in direct communication with Lima and the rest of the Republic.

The Cordillera del Condor, located in this region, was the scene of the border war between Peru and Ecuador in 1981.

== Geography ==
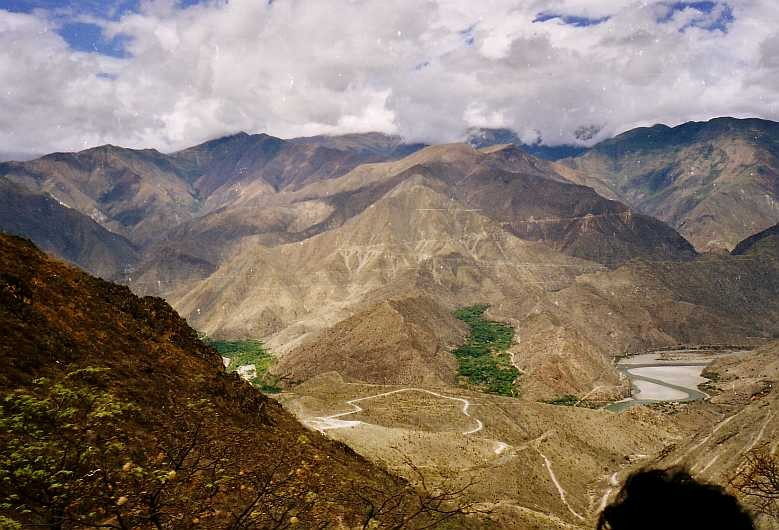
Marañón valley between Chachapoyas and Celendin, Peru

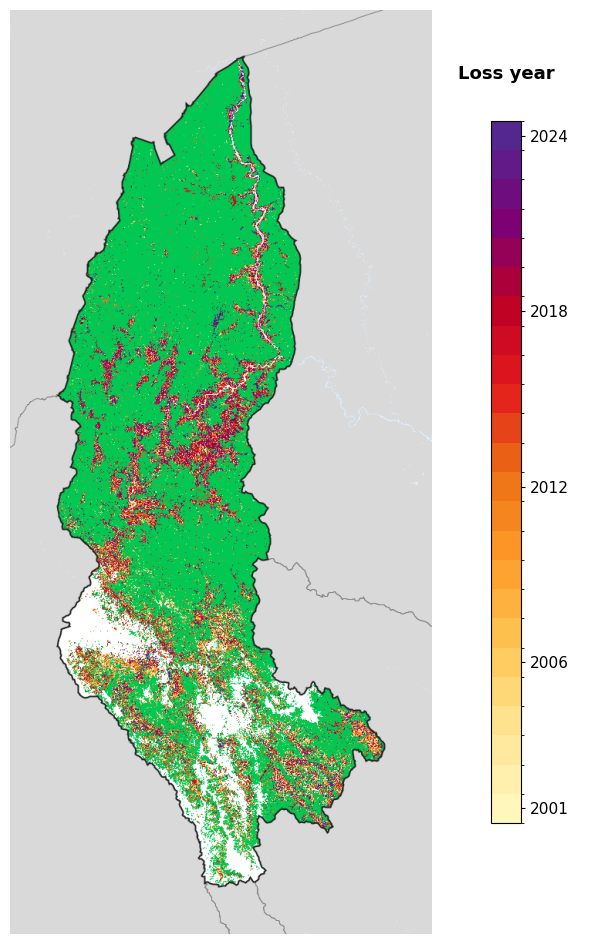
Tree-cover loss year in Amazonas, 2001-2024, from the Global Forest Change dataset.

The department of Amazonas consists of regions covered by rainforests and mountain ranges. The rainforest zone predominates (72.93%) and it extends to the north over its oriental slope, up to the border with Ecuador in the summits of the Cordillera del Cóndor. The mountain range zone is located in the southern provinces of the Amazonas Region and it only includes 27.07% of its whole territorial surface.

One of the factors that help to give big importance to its geography is not only that the big valleys and plains of its rainforest zone are the closest to the Pacific Ocean, but also its connections with the routes of the coast are the lowest. This is because they use the Paso de Porculla (the mountain pass of Porculla) that is located at 2,144 m. This is the lowest pass of the whole Peruvian Andes to arrive to the Pan-American road system.

The vast and deep Marañón valley which constitutes one of the most important morphologic features of the region.

The Marañón valley crosses a big part of its territory and expands itself from south to north. It reaches its greatest width in the province of Bagua. It narrows when it crosses the Cordillera Oriental (Spanish for "eastern mountain range") in its most violent route towards the east, towards the lowest part of the Amazon. It crosses canyons and natural porches called punkus, a Quechua word that means doors.

The Utkupampa valley which is the real axis of the department of Amazonas is located between 5° and 6° of south latitude and 78° and 79° of west longitude. It is longitudinally developed up to the Marañón River, in which it flowed at 400 m.

This zone is the principal center of production and human groups location. It is developed in four very pronounced sectors:

- Vertiente del Marañon (Marañon's spring), that has important quebradas (Seca, Bocana, Copallín Nuevo and Choloque).
- Valle Medio (the middle valley) that has eleven quebradas in its both borders.
- Valle Alto (the high valley) that has seven quebradas. The most important one is Magunchal.
- Planicie de Bagua (the Bagua's plain), wavy and picturesque, that is located at 550 m. In some places, it mounts up to 900 m., for example in the inhabited point called La Peca.

The principal tributaries of the Utkupampa are the Chiriaco, the Nieva, the Santiago (that is born in Ecuador) and the Cenepa, that is born in the north zone of the Cordillera del Cóndor. The Cenepa River receives in its trip numerous tributaries like the Comaina. It flowed in the Marañon river, located near Orellana (Condorcanqui Province).

=== Climate, rates and distance information ===
Weather	Warm, with very well defined rainy and dry seasons.
Temperature	Annual average 14.5 °C (58.1 °F)
Road network	1,600 kilometres (990 mi)
Illiteracy rate	20%
Child mortality rate	52 per thousand
Distances	From Chachapoyas to Lima 1,191 kilometres (740 mi); From Chachapoyas to Moyobamba 193 kilometres (120 mi); From Chachapoyas to Cajamarca 335 kilometres (208 mi)

=== Route to Huallaga Central: Plain of Bagua ===
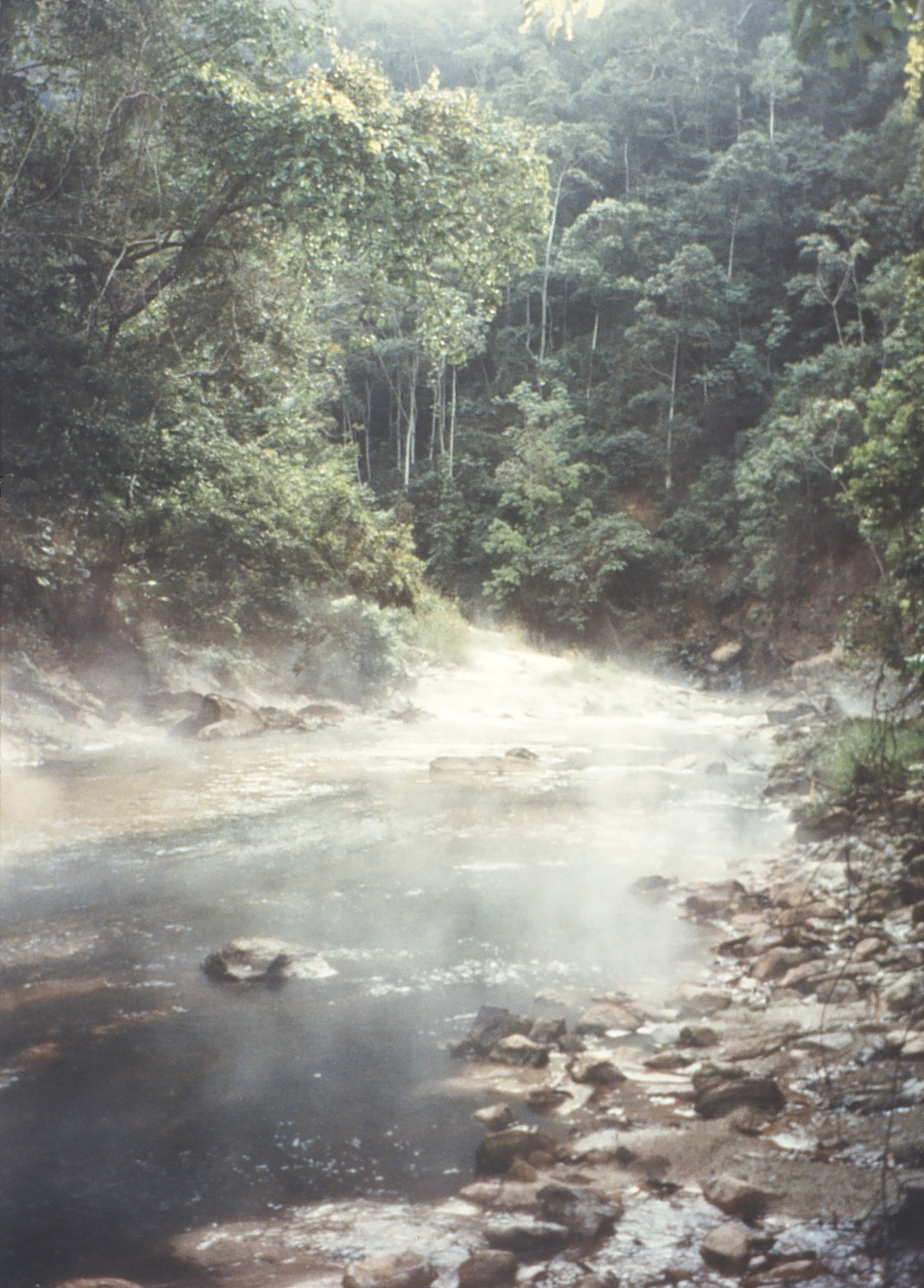
Hot springs in the Rupa Rupa Region

The Utkupampa valley which is born in the high jalcas of the Chachapoyas Province and which runs from southeast to northwest to mix with the waters of the Marañón River, forms the immense plain of Bagua. This plain has a warm climate, which temperature can reach a maximum of 40 °C, being the minimum one 21 °C.

Like in the whole high jungle region of Peru –head of mountain-, its water regimen is irregular and sometimes without rains.

Some of the important places inside this route are the touristic corridor of the Utkupampa and the lake Pumaqucha.

== Politics ==
=== Subdivisions ===
Map of provinces

The region is divided into 7 provinces (provincias, singular: provincia) which are composed of 83 districts (distritos, singular: distrito). The provinces and their capitals are:

Province	Capital	District
Bagua	Bagua	6
Bongará	Jumbilla	12
Chachapoyas	Chachapoyas	21
Condorcanqui	Sta. María de Nieva	3
Luya	Lamud	23
Rodríguez de Mendoza	Mendoza	12
Utcubamba	Bagua Grande	7

== Demographics ==
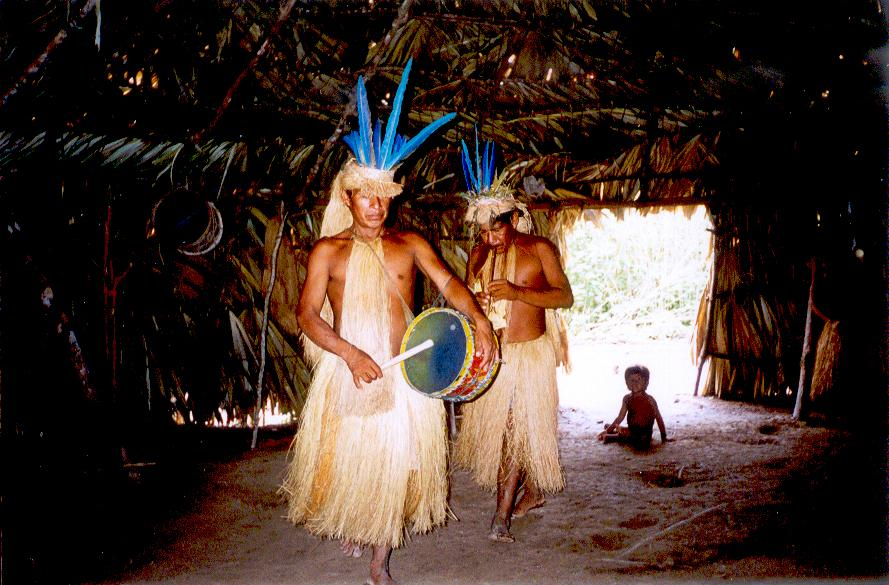
Aguarunas natives.

=== Population ===
Census	Population
1981	268,121
1993	354,171
2007	456,029
2017	417,365
2025	467,845

=== Languages ===
According to the 2007 Peru Census, the language learnt first by most of the residents was Spanish (84.90%). The following table shows the results concerning the language learnt first in the Amazonas Region by province:

Province	Quechua	Aymara	Asháninka	Another native language	Spanish	Foreign language	Deaf or mute	Total
Bagua	131	15	16	16,108	49,881	3	122	66,276
Bongará	20	3	6	34,681	3,541	5	60	38,316
Chachapoyas	114	13	5	38	46,467	21	147	46,805
Condorcanqui	26	6	5	16	25,644	13	73	25,783
Luya	34	6	-	6	44,671	8	274	44,999
Rodríguez de Mendoza	18	2	5	1	24,644	-	80	24,750
Utcubamba	115	20	9	187	100,958	1	194	101,484
Total	458	65	46	51,037	295,806	51	950	348,413
%	0.13	0.02	0.01	14.65	84.90	0.01	0.27	100.00

=== Ethnicity ===
The majority of the population is Mestizo. Among others the region is populated by Aguaruna and Huambisa people.

Ethnicity in Amazonas
Ethnicity	Percentage	Number
Mestizo	74.4%	219,375
Others	14.5%	42,868
White	4.6%	13,509
Afro-Peruvian	3.5%	10,282
Quechua	3%	8,830
Aymara	Negligible	187

=== Religion ===
Religion in Amazonas (2017)
Religion	Percentage	Number
Catholicism	63.2%	194,677
Evangelical	23.4%	72,157
Irreligious	8.3%	25,554
Other Religion	5.1%	15,647

=== Literacy ===
In 2017, 83.4% (326,784) of the population is literate and 16.6% (65,235) of the population is illiterate.

Ethnicity in Amazonas
1. Mestizo (74.4%)
2. Other (including Indigenous Amazonian such as Aguaruna, Huambisa, Asháninka, etc.) (14.5%)
3. Quechua (3.00%)
4. Afro-Peruvian (3.50%)
5. White (4.60%)

=== Notable people ===
- Blas Valera
- Toribio Rodríguez de Mendoza
- Manuel Antonio Mesones Muro
- José del Carmen Marín

== Economy ==
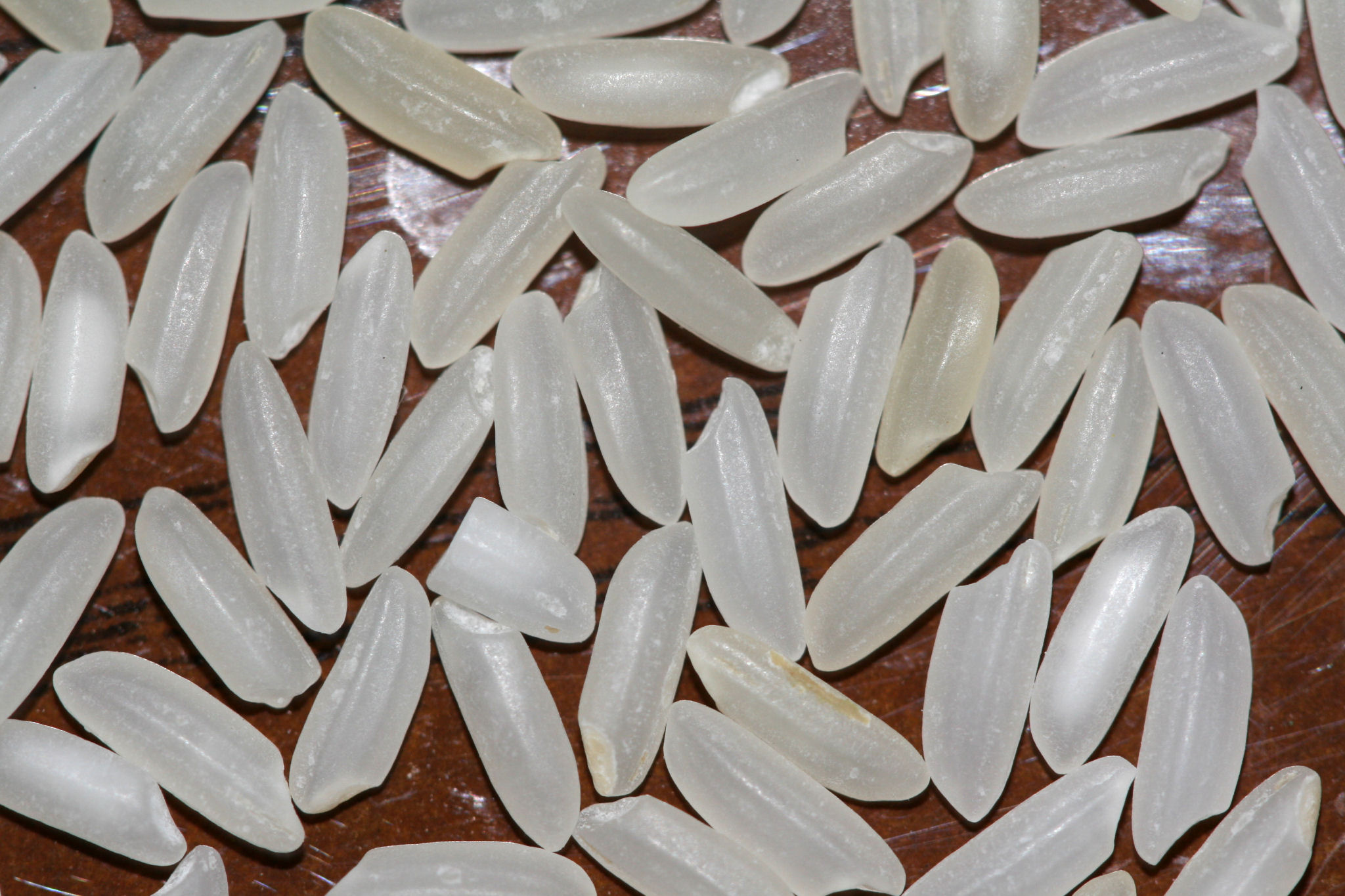
Rice is the most important cultivation in this region.

This department includes inter-Andean and forest regions. It has a strong forest and hydro energy potential. The province of Bagua, because of geographical factors, has an agricultural development producing such commodity crops as rice, coffee, Cocoa bean, fruit trees and livestock.

The department of Amazonas presents three well-defined geographical areas with distinct climates:

- District of El Cenepa (province of Condorcanqui), humid tropical forest
- Province of Bagua, has a dry tropical forest; and
- The other provinces have the Amazonian very humid low mountainous forest, humid subtropical forest, and dry low mountainous forest.

The provinces of Bongará, Luya and Chachapoyas present a very hilly geographical configuration, that gives them mountain range characteristics. They have been called the Amazonian Andes.

Amazonas has a primarily agrarian economy. It also features mining and energy, specifically, hydropower and oil development.

The department has excellent and favorable conditions in both: climate and pastures availability for the agricultural-livestock development.

The information about structure of the agricultural surface, size of the agricultural units, main cultivations and cattle population is taken from what was recorded in the III National Agricultural Census 1994 (III CENAGRO), made by the Instituto Nacional de Estadística e Informática (INEI) (National Institute of Statistics and Informatics).

The department of Amazonas has 48,173 agricultural units (UA) with 9,811.75 km^{2} (3,788.34 sq mi). 99.9% of the UA have lands and 0.1% do not have them. This 0.1% are exclusively dedicated to the breeding of animals.

=== Structure of the agricultural area ===
Agricultural structure	Surface area (ha)^{*}
a. Total	975,034
b. Agricultural surface	159,934
– Farming lands	71,595
– Permanent cultivations	69,579
– Associate cultivations	18,760
c. Non agricultural surface	815,100
– Natural grasslands	212,371
– Scrublands and forests	538,032
– Other types of lands	64,697

^{*} It only considers the area of the agricultural units that have worked lands.

From the total of agricultural lands (9750.34 km^{2}), only 16,4% includes the agricultural area and 83,6% includes the non-agricultural area.

=== Size of the agricultural units and principal cultivations ===
Main variables	Agricultural unit^{*}	Surface area (ha)
a. Main transitory cultivations	34,363	69,794
– Rice	4,294	12,942
– Dry yellow maize	9,634	12,508
– Yucca	11,186	10,896
– Banana	8,058	8,448
– Sugarcane for producing alcohol	5,702	4,156
– Soft corn	3,376	4,112
b. Main permanent cultivations	18,610	29,865
– Coffee	12,232	19,819
– Cocoa bean	2,282	3,121
– (soft) sharp lemon	351	409
– Coca	290	254
– Aguaje	235	253

^{*} It only considers the area of the agricultural units that have worked lands.

Agricultural units with 0.5 km^{2} (0.19 sq mi) and more only represent 4.4% of the whole department, but concentrate 61.8% of the agricultural surface.

Rice is the main transitory cultivation of the department. It brings together 18.5% of the agricultural surface with transitory cultivations (129.42 km^{2}). Dry yellow maize with 125.08 km^{2} (48.29 sq mi) (17.9%) is the second important one.

Coffee concentrates 66.4% of the agricultural area with permanent cultivations (198.19 km^{2}), followed by Theobroma cacao (cocoa bean) with 31.21 km^{2} (12.05 sq mi) (10,5%).

=== Livestock population by species ===
Livestock species	Agricultural unit	Quantity of animals
Cattle	21,857	139,267
Sheep	5,476	27,180
Pigs	14,573	34,421
South American camelids (alpaca, llama and guanaco)	29	282

Cattle is the most important one in the department. It is raised in 21,857 AU (Agricultural units) with a population of 139,267 head of cattle. Pigs are the second one with 34,421 head, distributed in 14,573 AU.

== Culture ==
Several institutions are linked with the Amazon region in Peru and help its economic and social development and preservation. These include the following:

- Asociación Interétnica de Desarrollo de la Selva (AIDESEP) – Interethnic Association for the Rainforest Development
- Centro Amazónico de Antropología y Aplicación Práctica (CAAAP) – Amazon Center of Anthropology and Practical Application
- Instituto Lingüístico de Verano – Linguistic Summer Institute

=== Folklore ===
The folklore of Amazonas is not as varied as in other departments of Peru.

The profusion of dances, songs and clothing is not seen in here, like in Puno or Cuzco. Its folklore is nourished from legends and stories in which mystery and inexplicable things are always present. Towns, lagoons, hills, religious images, always have an origin that violates in an invariable way the rules of logic or biology.

For example, Quchakunka (Cochaconga) is subject to supertition. It has the "form of a neck" and that with the smallest noise provoked by an animal or the scream of a person, there will be a tremendous thunderstorm in which an enormous monster will appear in the shape of cow. This monster will become mad with the strangers. That's why, whoever passes by this remote place, does it with precaution for not altering the local silence.

To give accommodation to travelers is an elementary norm of good behaviour with people. To deny it can provoke the most tremendous evil on the selfish person. An irrefutable evidence is the marsh of Mono Muerto (Dead Monkey's marsh), in the Huambo District (Rodríguez de Mendoza Province). A dramatic story that people tell, with more or less details, but with the same respect.

A very rich man was living in his house. The marsh was a part of his estate, in which he was happy and lacking of nothing, until the day a traveler asked him for home and he denied it to him. A witch doctor of the surroundings, who found out about the attitude of the wealthy neighbor, entrusted that all the curses fell on him. All his goods disappeared and his grounds became a stinking marsh.

Mysterious power are also assumed to the four lagoons of Pukyu, in which there are monsters that influence the crops, as well as to the lake Santa Barbara which disappears before the view of the walkers and it is destined to initiate the end of the world with the overflow of its waters.

Next to the city Chachapoyas there is a hill called Pisquwañuna (Piscohuañuna), in the way towards the forest. This name means "where the bird dies", because the mountain kills all the birds that approach it.

People attribute pernicious influences to certain animals like the mochuelo that "freezes the soul", or "quien-quien", that makes fun of the travelers in the roads; or the cricket, which singing in certain circumstances, like when it has sound of bells, presages big evil.

People have big respect to the antique remains. They firmly believe that there will be terrifying punishments for those who violate the graves of the "agüelos" (mummies).

Most of the population of the department of Amazonas is indigenous and mestizo, being notable the people' quantity, in some cases entire communities, in which the Spanish type predominates. Since the time of the Incas, there are legends about the existence of white people in these places. There are also versions gathered by chroniclers in which they assure that women were chosen here for the Inca, precisely because they were white.

=== Dances ===
Some of the dances most representative of the Department of Amazonas are:

- The Chumaichada
- Huanca (dance)
- The Danzantes de Levanto (Levanto's Dancers)
- Carnaval en Amazonas (Carnival in Amazonas)

=== Religious festivities ===
There are three Virgins who are famous:

- Virgen de Belén (Virgin of Bethlehem) in Chachapoyas.
- Virgen de Sonche (Virgin of Sonche)
- Virgen de Levanto (Virgin of Levanto)

Well, there is no one who does not believe the story that said that the three Virgins were found in a cave to which a young shepherd was mysteriously attracted. And when the Virgin of Levanto goes to Chachapoyas "her sisters" go to the outer parts of the town for "receiving her".

The venerated image of Santa Lucía (Saint Lucy) was also found by a girl in a cave. Cristo de Bagazán (Christ of Bagazán), who is venerated in Rioja, was also found by a stockbreeder who was looking for a lost ox. Near Almirante, he heard a voice that was calling him by his name from the interior of a cave, in which he found a Christ image that told him: "take me".

In days of long drought, Cristo de la Contradicción (the Christ of Contradiction) disappears from the chapel of the cemetery of Chachapoyas and he is "discovered" when it begins to rain, beginning then big celebrations up to the time of taking him to his place again.

Corpus Christi, Holy Week, the Assumption, Dia de los Difuntos (Day of the death), and Christmas are classic dates in the calendar of this department. In Christmas Days there are groups of little shepherds that walk around the streets singing and dancing in front of the cribs. With the same splendour, the patronal feasts are celebrated in all the towns.

One of the most well-known and traditional celebrations is known as:

- Los pastorcillos de Navidad (Christmas's little shepherds)

=== Gastronomy ===
Some of the most well-known and delicious typical dishes of this region are the following:

- Tamalitos
- Cazuela
- Carne arrollada (rolled beef)
- Purtumute
- Humitas de choclo (sweet tamale made of corn)
- Chipasmute
- Plátanos rellenos (stuffed bananas)

=== Landmarks ===
- Cordillera de Colán Reserved Zone
- Ichigkat Muja – Cordillera del Condor National Park
- Santiago-Comaina Reserved Zone
- Gocta Cataracts

== See also ==
- Extinct languages of the Marañón River basin
- Amazonas State, Venezuela
- Amazonas State, Brazil
