= Florida District, Peru =

Coordinates: 5°50′S 77°55′W

Florida
- District
- Interactive map of Florida
- Region: Amazonas
- Province: Bongará
- Time zone: UTC-5 (PET)

Florida is one of the twelve districts of the Bongará Province in the Amazonas Region of Peru. Its seat is Pomacochas, also named Florida. It is located approximately 90 km from Bagua Grande, at the route of the Peruvian forest for the marginal highway of the forest, today called Fernando Belaunde Terry.

The borders of the district are:

- To the north: Yambrasbamba District
- To the south: Shipasbamba District and Cuispes District.
- To the east: Jumbilla District and Cuispes.
- To the west: Utcubamba Province.

The access to the capital of the district is by asphalted highway of the Forest Fernando Belaunde Terry. It is an intermediate step of Chachapoyas to Lima.

The highway of the (Pan-American) coast (Fernando Belaunde Terry) joins to that of the forest doing a whole of 1,525 km, which is asphalted for its entire length.

In accordance with the census conducted in the district in the year 2003, it has a population of 5,117 inhabitants, 2,839 or (56%) belong to rural population and 2,275 inhabitants or (44%) are urban population.

Lake Pomacochas is situated within the district.
