= Corosha District =

Coordinates: 5°50′S 77°45′W

Corosha
- District
- Interactive map of Corosha
- Country: Peru
- Region: Amazonas
- Province: Bongará
- Founded: July 20, 1946
- Capital: Corosha

Government
  - Mayor: Cesar Llatas Delgado

Area
  - Total: 45.67 km^{2} (17.63 sq mi)
- Elevation: 2,180 m (7,150 ft)

Population (2005 census)
  - Total: 680
  - Density: 15/km^{2} (39/sq mi)
- Time zone: UTC-5 (PET)
- UBIGEO: 010304
- Website: municorosha.gob.pe

Corosha District is one of twelve districts of the province Bongará in Peru.

== Geography ==
Corosha District is located in the Central Cordillera of Peru, in the eastern-central part of Bongará Province in the Amazonas Region. A mountain ridge rising above 3,000 metres forms the district's eastern boundary. The upper course of the Imaza River flows northward along the district's western boundary.

Corosha District borders Jumbilla District to the southwest, Florida District to the west, Yambrasbamba District to the north, Pardo Miguel District in Rioja Province to the east, and Chisquilla District to the southeast.
