= Cuispes District =

Coordinates: 5°55′S 77°56′W

Cuispes
- District
- Interactive map of Cuispes
- Country: Peru
- Region: Amazonas
- Province: Bongará
- Time zone: UTC-5 (PET)

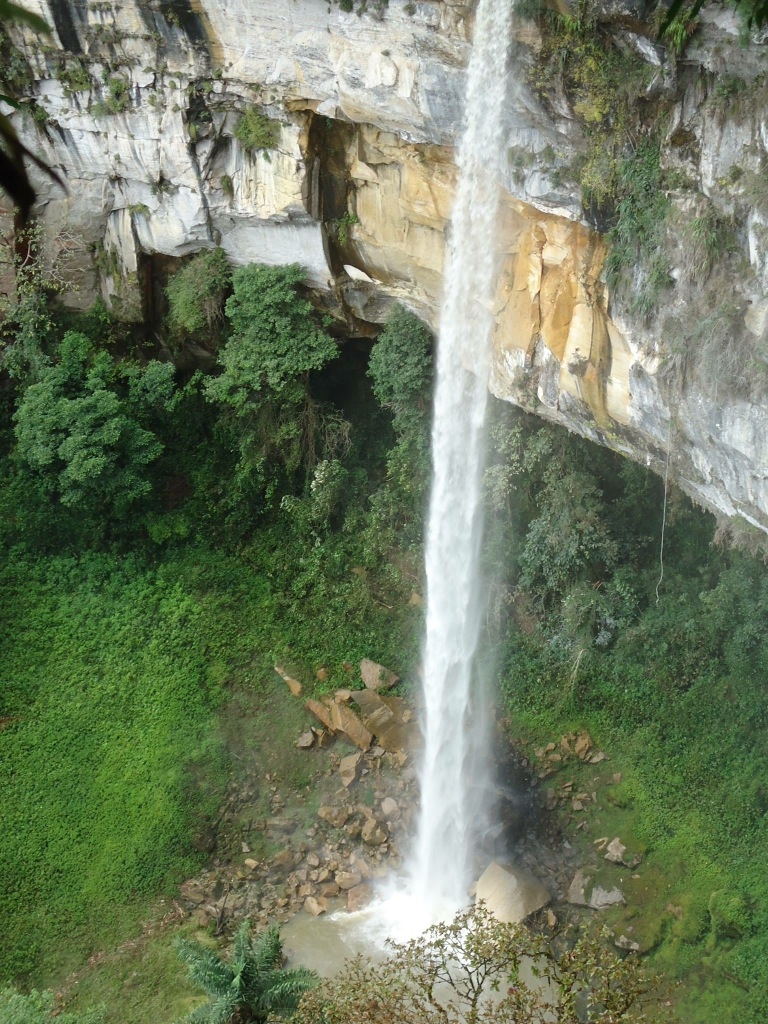
The Yumbilla waterfall within the district

Cuispes is one of the 12 districts of the province of Bongará, located in the Amazonas Region in the north of Peru.

It is bordered to the north by the District of Florida; to the east by the District of Jumbilla; to the south by the District of San Carlos; and to the west by the District of Shipasbamba.

It is part of the Diocese of Chachapoyas.

== History ==
The district was created on 11 November 1944, by Law #1004, during the first government of President Manuel Prado Ugarteche.

== Geography ==
Cuispes District covers 110.72 km2. It has a varied topography, ranging from 1,000 m to 1,690 m above sea level, with highlands, plateaus, and waterfalls, including the majestic Yumbilla.

According to a 2005 Census, the population density was 7.8 people per km2, and the population was estimated to be over 700 inhabitants. This number has increased markedly, however, in the last 10 years.

The capital is the town of Cuispes, which is home to some 200 families.

== Economy ==
Most of the population is involved in agriculture - such as growing potatoes, maize, fruit and coffee - and livestock raising.

78.55% of the land of Cuispes District is owned by smallholders, who mostly grow temporary crops; meanwhile, 22.45% of the land is used for permanent crops.

== Festivals ==
- June: Festival of San Juan.

== Tourist Attractions ==
Cuispes' main tourist attraction is the Yumbilla Falls, the fifth highest waterfall in the world. Hidden in the high jungle vegetation, Yumbilla remained unknown - except to locals - until 2007, when it was visited by a group of scientists from the Peruvian National Geographic Institute (IGN), who asserted at the time that the height of the waterfall, at 895.4m (2,938 ft) high, placed it as the third highest in the world, and higher than the nearby Gocta Falls.

In the top part of the waterfall can be found the mysterious and beautiful San Francisco Cave. It is 5 m (16 ft) high and 9 m (29 ft) wide. Its depth is unknown: to date, the furthest anyone has gone is 250 m (820 ft).

Yumbilla Falls now receives Peruvian and overseas visitors, attracted by the beauty of the scenery. There is a 5.7 km (3.5 miles) trail from Cuispes town to the lower part of the waterfall. After an hour's hike, you arrive at the 'Sal si puedes ('Leave if you can')' Viewpoint, from where you can see most of the waterfall. The lower part of the waterfall is very impressive, as a large cloud of mist is created by the impact of the water on the rocks.

The IGN study indicated that the terrain around Yumbilla is mountainous, with small, medium and large trees with fauna including Andean cock of the rock, monkeys, reptiles and spectacled bears.

Cuipses District is also home to Chinata Falls (580 m / 1,903 ft) and Pabellon Falls (400 m / 1,312 ft).

The town of Cuispes now offers tourism services, such as horse rental, eateries and guides.

== See also ==
- Peruvian Amazon
