= Jumbilla =

Coordinates: 5°54′15.63″S 77°47′52.95″W

- Town
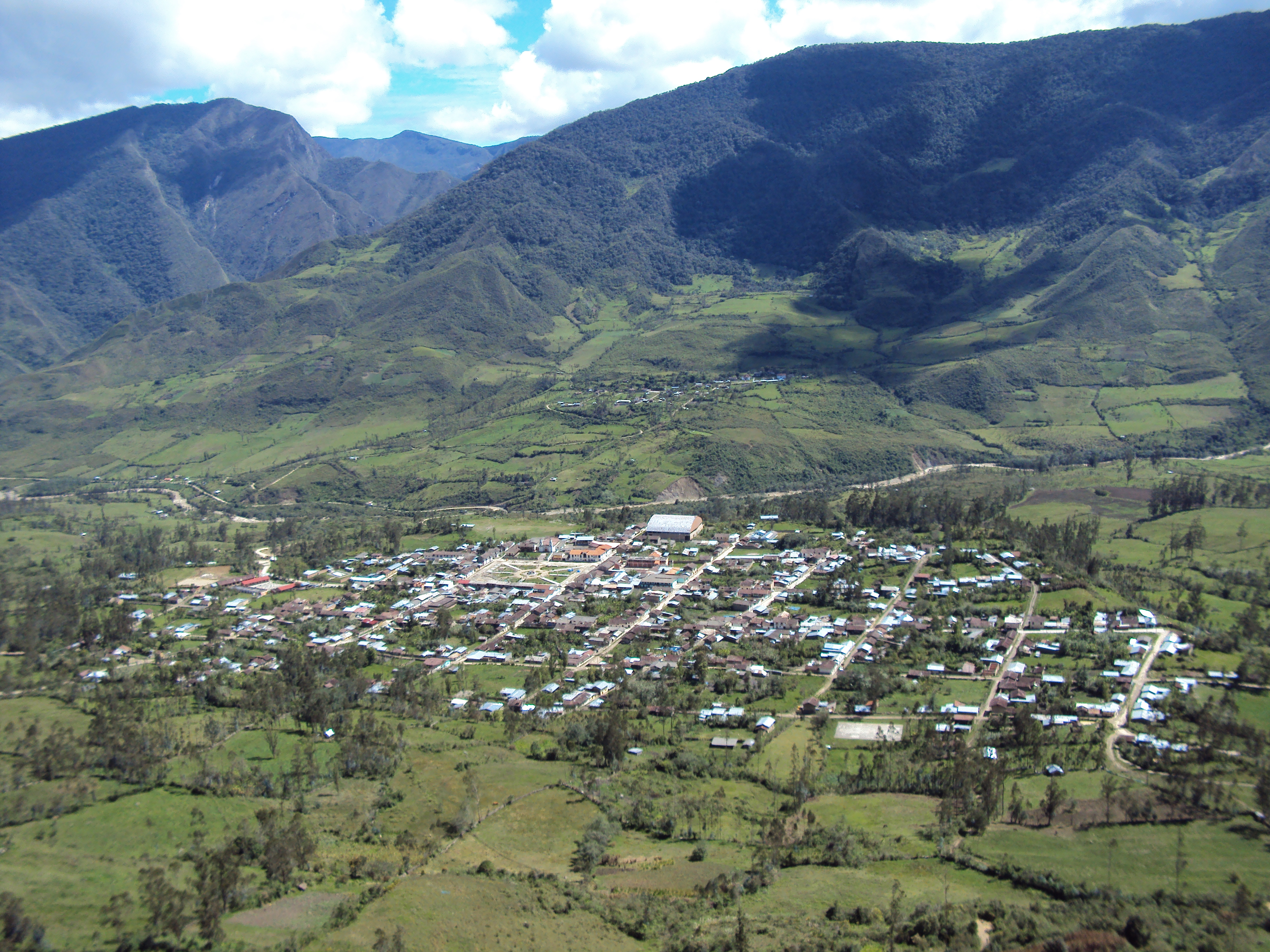
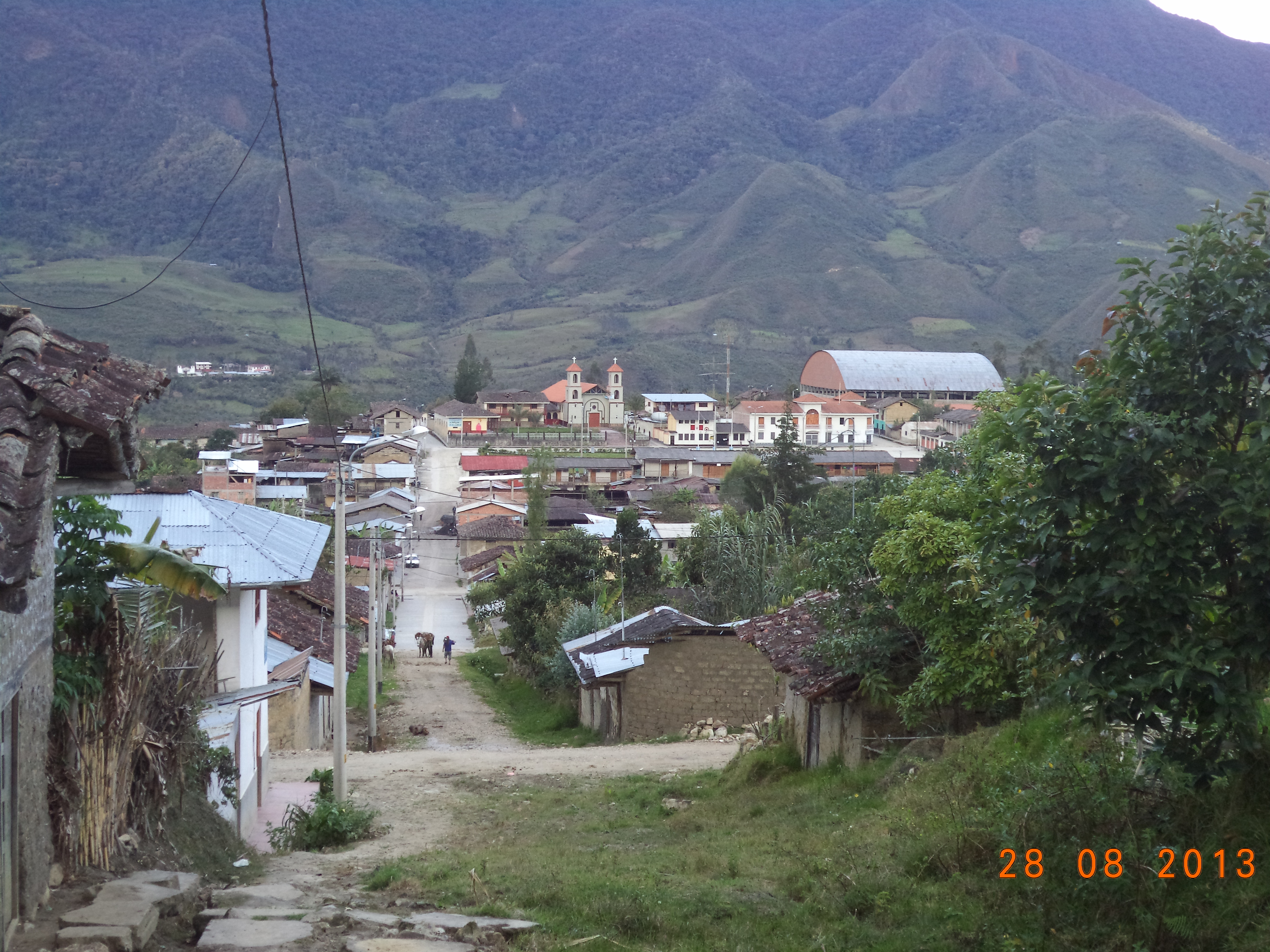
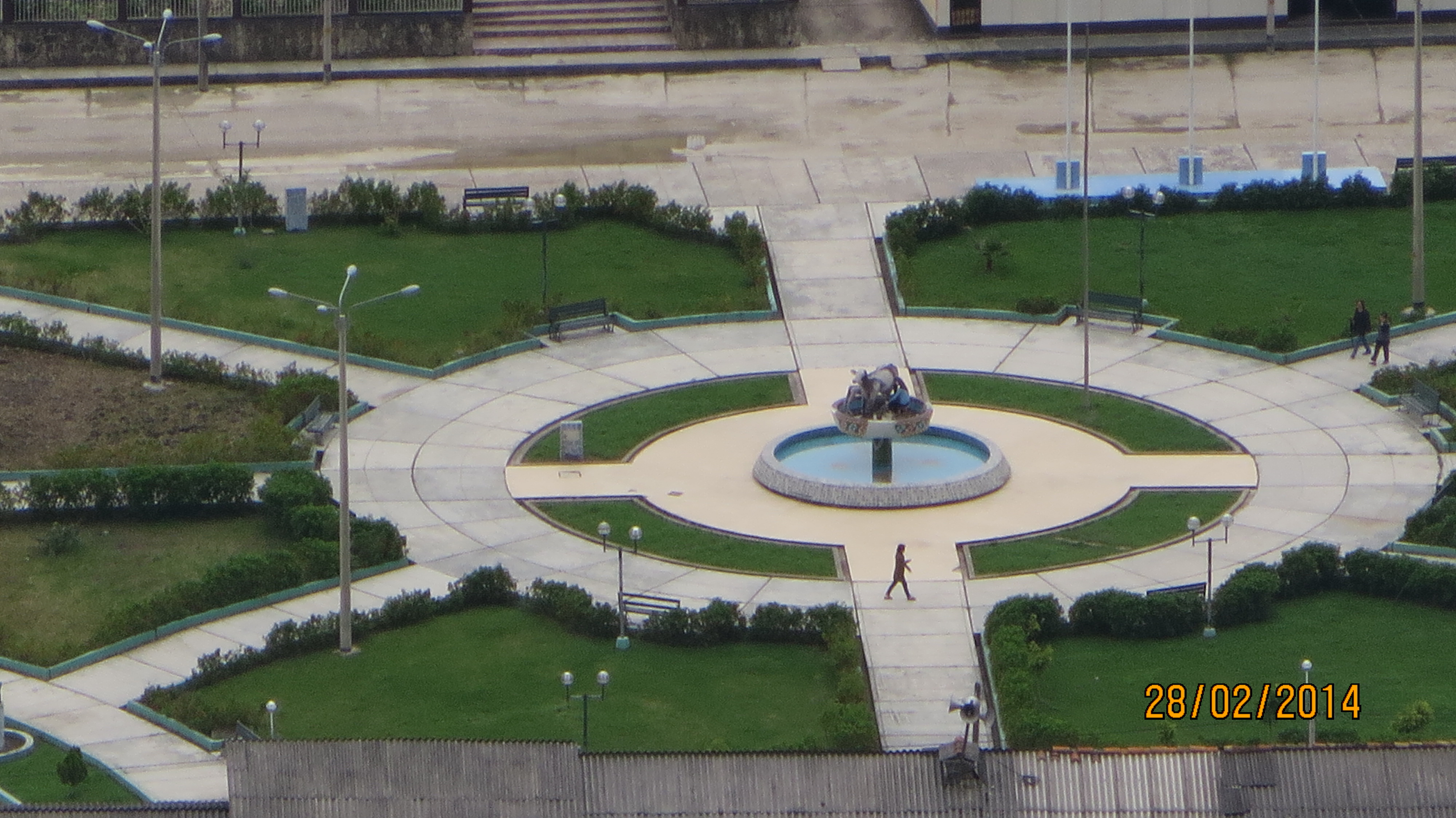
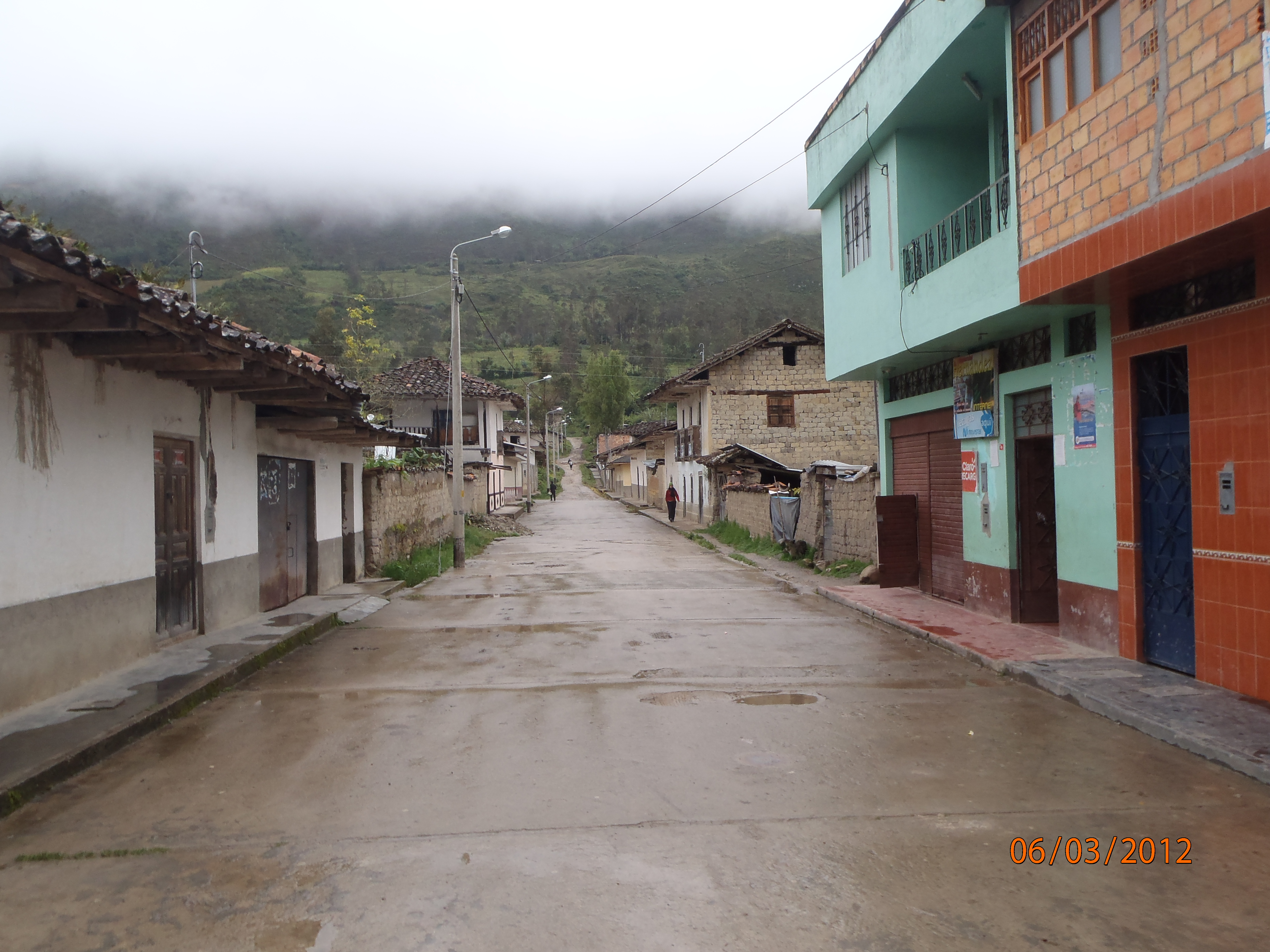
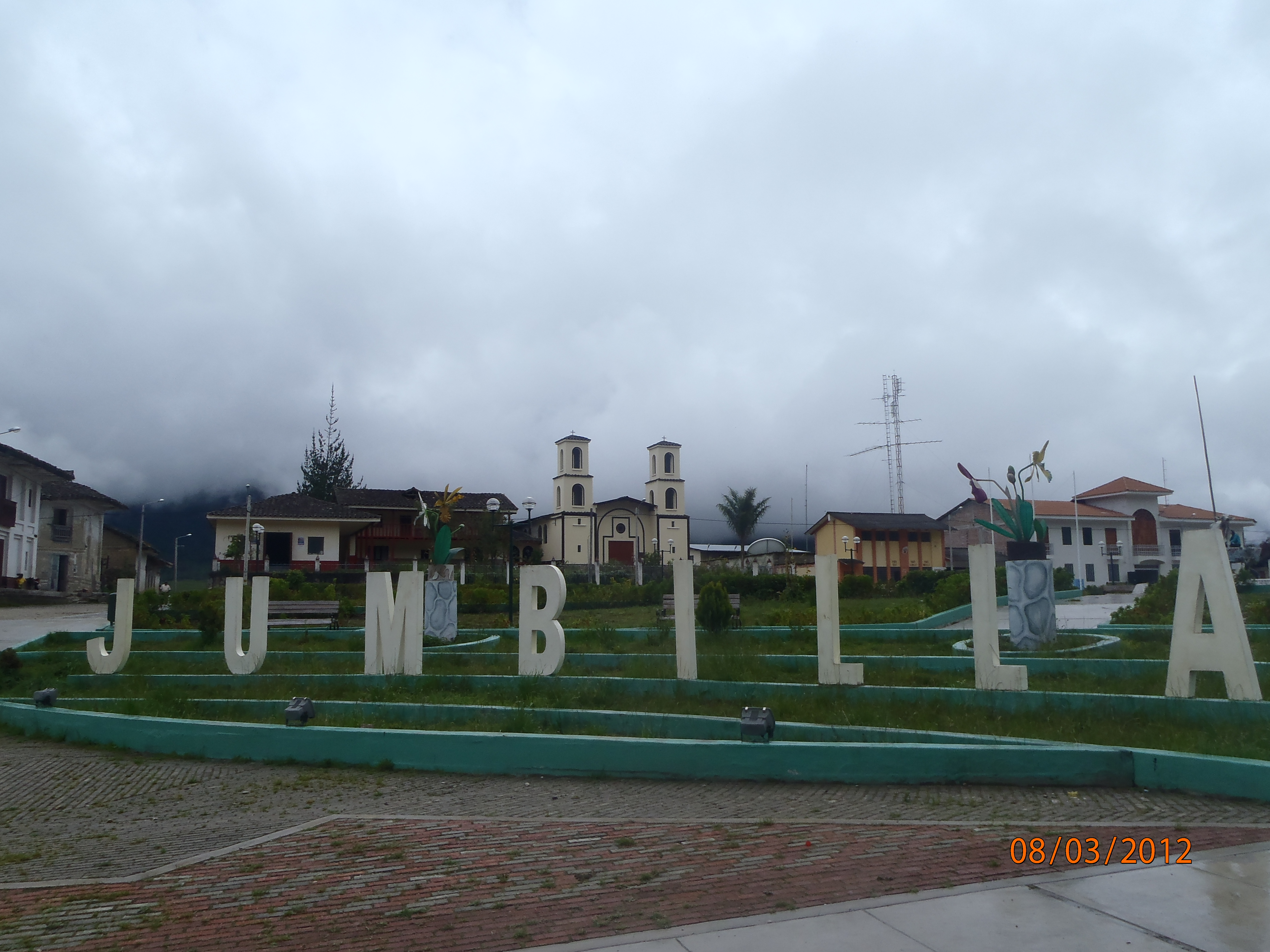
- Interactive map of Jumbilla
- Location within Peru
- Country: Peru
- Region: Amazonas
- Province: Bongará
- District: Jumbilla

Government
  - Mayor: Alejandro Bacalla Guadalupe
- Elevation: 1,935 m (6,348 ft)
- Time zone: UTC-5 (PET)

Jumbilla is a town in Northern Peru, capital of the district of Jumbilla and the province of Bongará in the region Amazonas, located at an altitude of 1935m.
