= Mondonguito =

Peruvian comedian (1959–2026)

José Lorenzo Zubiate Zegarra
- Born: 10 June 1959; Bagua Grande, Utcubamba, Amazonas, Peru
- Died: 13 November 2026 (aged 67); Lima, Peru
- Other name: Mondonguito (professional)
- Children: 3

Comedy career
- Years active: 1968–2025
- Medium: Television
- Genres: Cómico ambulante Monologue; Comic actor

José Lorenzo Zubiate Zegarra (10 June 1959 – 13 November 2026), known professionally as Mondonguito, was a Peruvian comedian. He attained major recognition as a member of the artistic collective known as the cómicos ambulantes (roughly, "street comics") and for his participation in the main cast of the comedic programme Los ambulantes de la risa on Panamericana Televisión.

== Early life and career ==
Zubiate Zegarra was born on 10 June 1959 in Bagua Grande, in the Department of Amazonas into a lower-class family. He lived his earliest years in the Comas District in the Peruvian capital Lima, where he had moved owing to his parents' work.

He began his artistic career as a circus performer – a job that came to him at the age of nine with Tony Perejil's help – appearing in various shows in 1968 as a clown, a juggler, and a street performer. This afforded Zubiate the opportunity to choose comedy as a career path, working as a cómico ambulante at the Plaza San Martín under the professional name "Mondonguito" — chosen in honour of his favourite food, "mondonguito a la italiana". In this new facet of his life, he formed a duo with the comedian Alberto Rojas, who was there with him in his comedic beginnings.

In 1991, he received an invitation from television presenter Augusto Ferrando to take part in one of the sequences of the now cancelled programme Trampolín a la fama, while he was performing his monologues and jokes to entertain the public. It was thus that Zubiate appeared for the first time on television, in that programme, in a segment called "El ambulante de la risa", for his performance in which he earned great acclaim. Sometime later, Zubiate began a further career phase as a comic actor joining the cast of the programme Ambulantísimo for TV Perú in 1993.

It was, however, in 1998, when the opportunity came Zubiate's way to participate in the new format Los reyes de la risa ("The Kings of Laughter") for the Global network, sharing sequences with other cómicos ambulantes such as José Luis Cachay, Kike Suero, Danny Rosales, Juan Castellanos "Tripita", Edwin Aurora, and Héctor Chavarria "Loncherita", but without any success. Owing to this, he was invited to Mónica Zevallos's Talk show, which was broadcast over Panamericana Televisión, and in 1999, Zubiate was part of the same network's comedic show Los ambulantes de la risa, once again working with the cast from Los reyes de la risa.

After this spot went off the air in 2000, Zubiate began the process of moving to France, through a cultural exchange that was proposed to him by his country's embassy. During his stay, he produced shows at the famous Moulin Rouge nightclub and went on tours through several European countries, living for fifteen years in Italy. Zubiate came back to Peru in 2015 to see his family again and once again to take up his act as a cómico ambulante, but with few appearances on television, sometimes working as a collaborator on the nighttime programme Al sexto día ("On the Sixth Day"). He vied in the Peruvian show Los reyes del playback in this year, and during the COVID pandemic, he produced his work at the market in his neighbourhood, San Juan de Lurigancho.

Owing to the premiere of the programme Jirón del humor ("Touch of Humour"), in March 2023 he was part of the comeback for Los ambulantes de la risa, which arose from an invitation from the television programme Porque hoy es sábado con Andrés ("Because Today is Saturday with Andrés"), premiering in the first sketch "Qué tal showngo". Nevertheless, given comments from comedian Alfonso González "Pompín" and problems with the presenter Andrés Hurtado, the project was deemed to be cancelled. At once, Mondonguito was in negotiations to take up his spot with Edwin Aurora and Kike Suero in April, and he got together with them the next month in the new format Esto es humor ("This is Humour") on Viva TV, his last work in television.

== Health and death ==
In 2024, Zubiate lost movement in his legs, and he sought help for his recovery from the communication media.

Zubiate died at the Hospital Cayetano Heredia in Lima, on 13 November 2026, at the age of 67, as a result of pulmonary fibrosis, which led to respiratory complications. His death was confirmed at 10am that morning.

== Television ==
| Year | Títle | Role | Network | Ref. |
|---|---|---|---|---|
| 1991 | Trampolín a la fama | Participant in the sequence El ambulante de la risa | Panamericana Televisión | |
| 1993–1994 | Ambulantísimo | Comedian and comic actor | TV Perú | |
| 1998 | Los reyes de la risa | Comedian and comic actor | Global network | |
| 1999 | Entre nos | Guest comedian | Panamericana Televisión | |
| 1999–2000 | Los ambulantes de la risa | Comedian and comic actor | Panamericana Televisión | |
| 2015 | Igualitos | Guest comedian | Panamericana Televisión | |
| 2015–2021 | Al sexto día | Collaborator | Panamericana Televisión | |
| 2016 | Los reyes del playback | Participant | Latina Televisión | |
| 2016 | Amor, amor, amor | Special guest | Latina Televisión | |
| 2022 | La banda del Chino | Interviewee | América Televisión | |
| 2023 | Porque hoy es sábado con Andrés | Guest comedian in the sequence Los ambulantes de la risa | Panamericana Televisión | |
| 2023 | Esto es humor | Comedian and comic actor | Viva TV | |
