= Wilca =

Archaeological site in Peru

Coordinates: 5.8596°S 78.1099°W

- Location within Peru
- Location: Peru
- Region: Amazonas Region, Utcubamba Province, Cajaruro District

Wilca (possibly from Aymara and Quechua) is an archaeological site in Peru. It is situated in the Amazonas Region, Utcubamba Province, in the east of the Cajaruro District, near the border with the Bongara Province.
