= Sporting Victoria (Peru) =

- Full name: Club Social y Deportivo Sporting Victoria
- Founded: May 25, 1964; 62 years ago
- Ground: San Luis, Bagua Grande
- Capacity: 5,000
- League: Copa Perú
Home colours

Club Social y Deportivo Sporting Victoria (sometimes referred as Sporting Victoria) is a Peruvian football club, playing in the city of Bagua Grande, Amazonas, Peru.

== History ==
The Club Social y Deportivo Sporting Victoria was founded on May 25, 1964.

In 2015 Copa Perú, the club qualified to the Provincial Stage, but was eliminated by Miguel Grau (Cumba) in the First Stage.

In 2017 Liga Departamental de Amazonas, the club was eliminated in the group stage.

In 2019 Copa Perú, the club qualified to the National Stage, but was eliminated when it finished in 46th place.

== Honours ==
=== Regional ===
- Liga Departamental de Amazonas:

Runners-up (1): 2019

- Liga Provincial de Utcubamba:

Winners (1): 2016
Runners-up (2): 2019

- Liga Distrital de Bagua Grande:

Runners-up (3): 2015, 2017, 2019

== See also ==
- List of football clubs in Peru
- Peruvian football league system
