= Valera District =

Coordinates: 6.033°S 77.915°W

Valera
- District
- Interactive map of Valera
- Country: Peru
- Region: Amazonas
- Province: Bongará
- Time zone: UTC-5 (PET)

Valera is a district of Bongará Province, in the Department of Amazonas, Peru. It includes the villages of San Pablo (capital of Valera), Cocahuayco, Cocachimba-La Coca, Nuevo Horizontes and Tingorbamba. The Gocta waterfall, 771 m (2,530 ft) high, is easily accessible from either San Pablo or Cocachimba, which are both accessible by road. The waterfall is a 6 km (3.7 mi). walk on a hiking trail, or by horseback from San Pablo. The capital, San Pablo, is at 1,900 m (6,200 ft) above sea level, and has an idyllic climate. It is lush, with around 1 metre (39 in) of annual rainfall and an average high temperature of 25 °C. It is traversed by the Utcubamba River. It is situated between the cities of Pedro Ruiz Gallo and Chachapoyas.
