= Bagua Grande District =

Coordinates: 5°45′22″S 78°26′28″W

Bagua Grande
- District
- Interactive map of Bagua Grande
- Country: Peru
- Region: Amazonas
- Province: Utcubamba
- Capital: Bagua Grande

Government
  - Mayor: Hidelfonso Guevara Honores

Area
  - Total: 746.64 km^{2} (288.28 sq mi)
- Elevation: 440 m (1,440 ft)

Population (2017)
  - Total: 50,841
  - Density: 68.093/km^{2} (176.36/sq mi)
- Time zone: UTC-5 (PET)
- UBIGEO: 010701

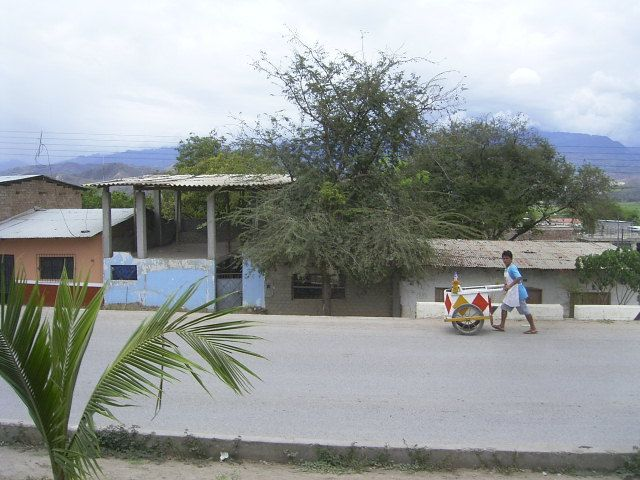

Bagua Grande District is one of seven districts of the province Utcubamba in Peru.

== Climate ==
Climate data for Bagua Chica, Bagua Grande, elevation 397 m (1,302 ft), (1991–2020)
Month	Jan	Feb	Mar	Apr	May	Jun	Jul	Aug	Sep	Oct	Nov	Dec	Year
Mean daily maximum °C (°F)	32.4 (90.3)	32.0 (89.6)	32.0 (89.6)	32.0 (89.6)	31.6 (88.9)	31.1 (88.0)	31.2 (88.2)	32.2 (90.0)	33.0 (91.4)	33.5 (92.3)	33.7 (92.7)	32.7 (90.9)	32.3 (90.1)
Mean daily minimum °C (°F)	22.0 (71.6)	22.2 (72.0)	22.4 (72.3)	22.5 (72.5)	22.3 (72.1)	21.5 (70.7)	20.9 (69.6)	21.0 (69.8)	21.6 (70.9)	22.4 (72.3)	22.4 (72.3)	22.3 (72.1)	22.0 (71.5)
Average precipitation mm (inches)	46.5 (1.83)	58.3 (2.30)	80.3 (3.16)	71.2 (2.80)	73.3 (2.89)	39.0 (1.54)	32.5 (1.28)	21.5 (0.85)	29.4 (1.16)	63.5 (2.50)	56.7 (2.23)	57.8 (2.28)	630 (24.82)
Source: National Meteorology and Hydrology Service of Peru
