= Lake Pomacochas =

Lake in Amazonas, Peru

- Lake Pomacocha
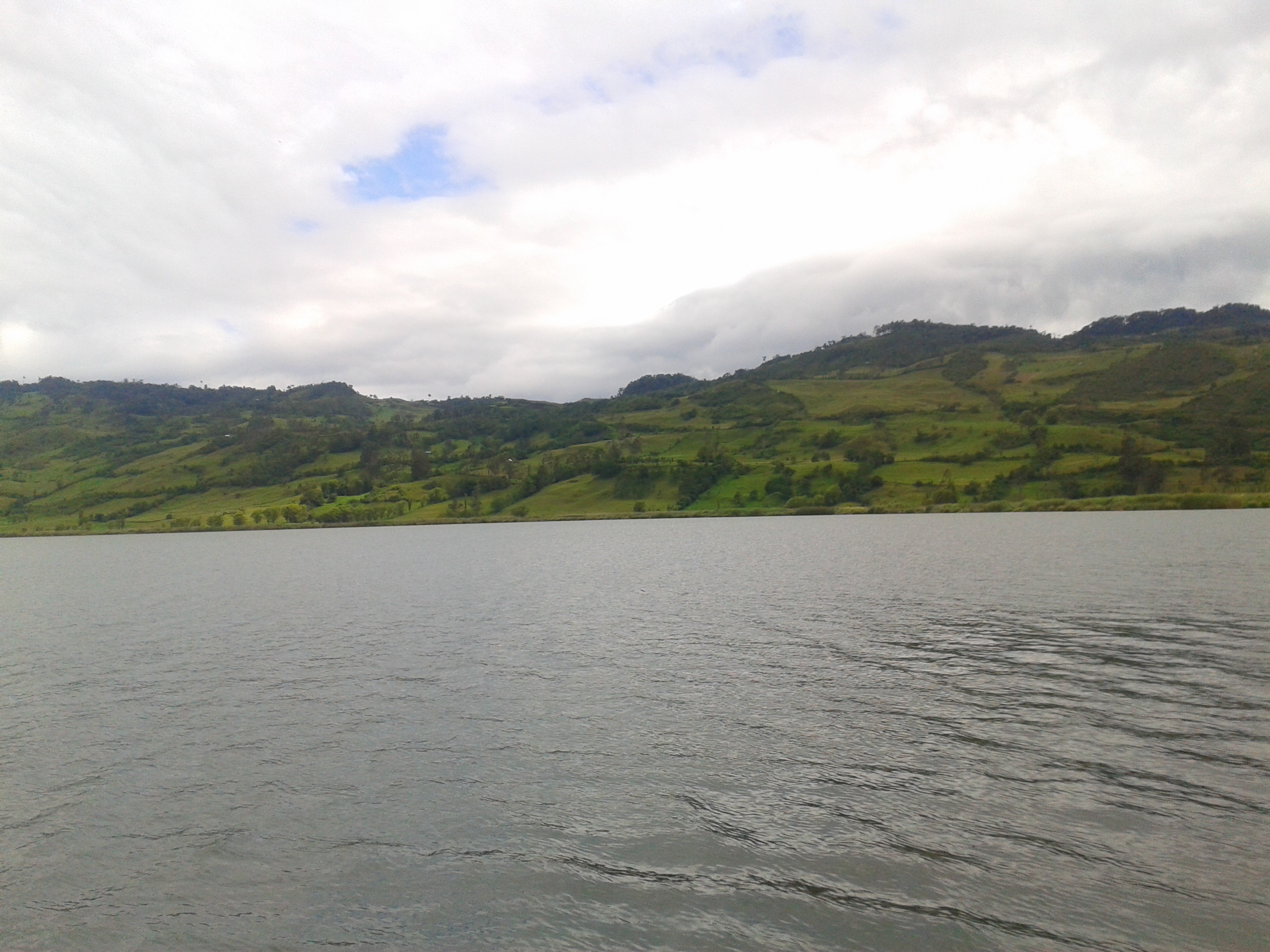
- Partial view of Lake Pomacochas

- Location within Peru
- Location: Bongará Province, Amazonas
- Coordinates: 5°49′31″S 77°56′53″W
- Basin countries: Peru
- Surface elevation: 2,257 m (7,405 ft)

Lake Pomacochas or Lake Pomacocha (possibly from Quechua puma cougar, puma, qucha lake) is a lake in Peru located near the town of Florida, Bongará Province, Amazonas. It has an elevation of 2,257 metres (7,405 ft).

== See also ==
- List of lakes in Peru
