= Yamón District =

Coordinates: 6°04′59″S 78°28′59″W

Yamón
- District
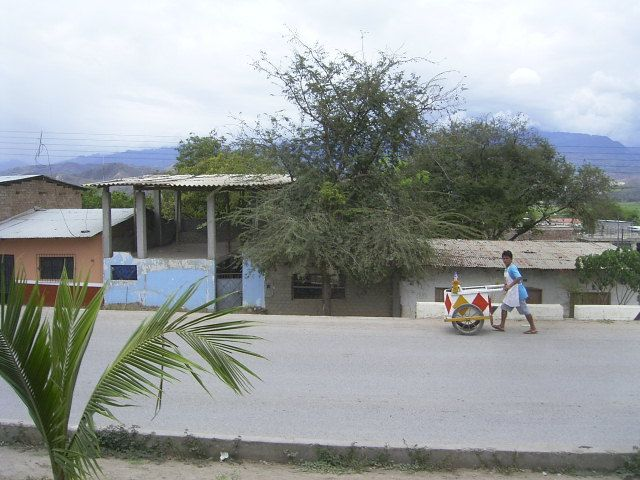
- Interactive map of Yamón
- Country: Peru
- Region: Amazonas
- Province: Utcubamba
- Founded: February 5, 1861
- Capital: Yamón

Government
  - Mayor: Esteban Perez Silva

Area
  - Total: 57.61 km^{2} (22.24 sq mi)
- Elevation: 1,022 m (3,353 ft)

Population (2005 census)
  - Total: 3,391
  - Density: 58.86/km^{2} (152.5/sq mi)
- Time zone: UTC-5 (PET)
- UBIGEO: 010707

Yamón District is one of seven districts of the province Utcubamba in Peru.
