= Cordillera de Colán National Sanctuary =

Protected area in Peru

- Santuario Nacional Cordillera de Colán
- IUCN category III (natural monument or feature)
- Location within Peru
- Location: Peru; Amazonas Region, Bagua Province, Utcubamba Province
- Coordinates: 5°35′S 78°14′W
- Area: 641 km^{2} (247 sq mi)
- Established: March 1, 2002
- Governing body: SERNANP
- Website: Santuario Nacional Cordillera de Colán (in Spanish)

Cordillera de Colán National Sanctuary (Spanish: Santuario Nacional Cordillera de Colán) is a protected area in Peru located in the Amazonas Region, in the Bagua and Utcubamba provinces.

== See also ==
- Natural and Cultural Peruvian Heritage
