= Yumbilla Falls =

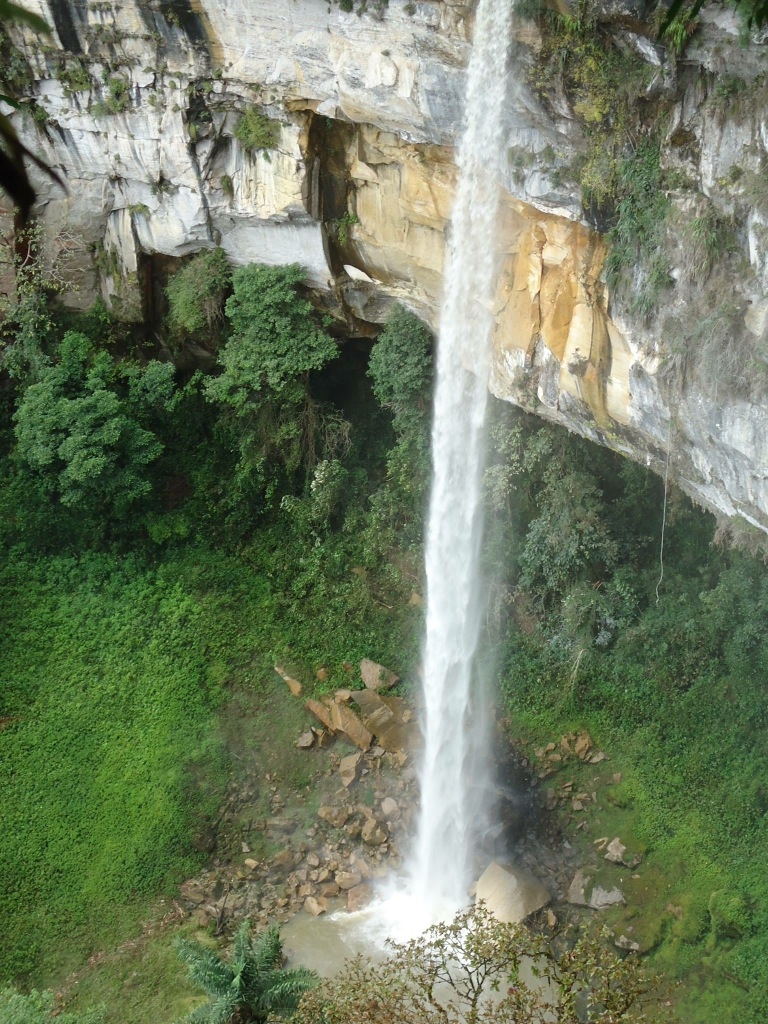
- Bottom section of the waterfalls

- Location within Peru
- Location: Amazonas Region, Peru
- Coordinates: 5°55′11.64″S 77°54′04.32″W
- Type: Tiered
- Total height: 895.5 m (2,938 ft)
- Number of drops: 4
- World height ranking: 5

Yumbilla Falls is a waterfall located near the town of Cuispes, in the northern Peruvian region of Amazonas. It is considered the world's fifth tallest waterfall, becoming internationally known since late 2007 due to a geographical survey conducted by the Geographical Institute of Peru (IGN).

== Geography ==
Yumbilla is 895.5 m (2,938 ft) high, with the top located 2,723.6 m (8,936 ft) above sea level and the base at 1,828.1 m (5,998 ft). The height was measured with the help of laser instruments by a geographical survey of the National Geographic Institute of Peru (IGN) in 2007. This area is part of the Eastern Peruvian Andes, also known as Cordillera Oriental, more precisely, part of a mountain massif called Cerro Panhuayco.

Yumbilla is considered a tiered type waterfall, since it comprises four or five sections or drops. The stream is reported to come from a cave named "Caverna San Francisco".

== Climate ==
The reported mean temperature in the area is 22 °C, with a rainy season from December to April.

== Ecology ==
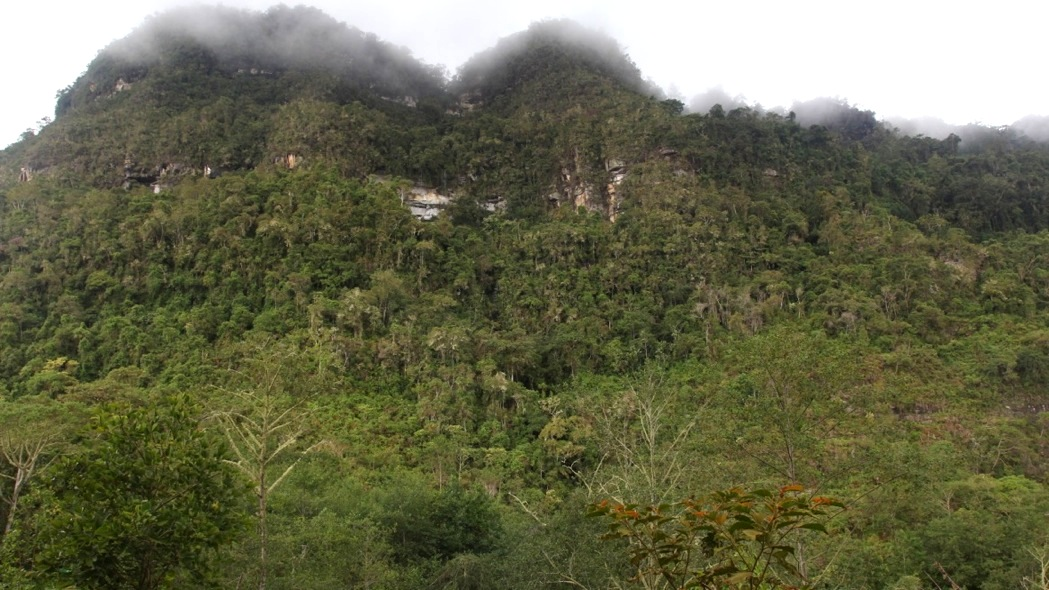
Montane forest around Cuispes.

=== Flora ===
The area around the waterfall is covered with montane forest vegetation. Bromeliads, orchids (Epidendrum secundum, Fernandezia ionanthera, Oncidium scansor), palms (Ceroxylon parvifrons), Andean alders (Alnus acuminata) and tree ferns (Cyathea spp.) are commonly found in the area.

=== Fauna ===
Animals reported in the area include birds like the Andean cock-of-the-rock and the marvellous spatuletail hummingbird; and mammals like the spectacled bear and the yellow-tailed woolly monkey.

== Tourism ==
From Chachapoyas, capital of the Amazonas region, it takes between 75-85 min. (63 km.) to arrive to the town of Cuispes (the road between the towns of Pedro Ruiz and Cuispes is a dirt road). Public transportation to Pedro Ruiz (buses and collective taxis) is available. From Pedro Ruiz to Cuispes (10 km./30 min.), the main public transportation are mototaxis.

From Cuispes, it takes 1-1.5 hours (6 km.) to reach Yumbilla waterfall by foot or on mule. It is advisable to hire a local guide.

The main activities in the area are hiking and wildlife watching.

There are also other waterfalls nearby, the most remarkable being: Pabellón (400 meters high) and Chinata (580 meters high), both within 4 km in a straight line.

== See also ==
- List of waterfalls
- List of waterfalls by height
