= San Carlos District, Bongará =

Coordinates: 5°52′00″S 77°52′59″W

San Carlos
- District
- Interactive map of San Carlos
- Country: Peru
- Region: Amazonas
- Province: Bongará
- Time zone: UTC-5 (PET)

San Carlos is a district of Bongará Province, Peru.
