= Nieva River =

Coordinates: 4.5944°S 77.8639°W

Nieva
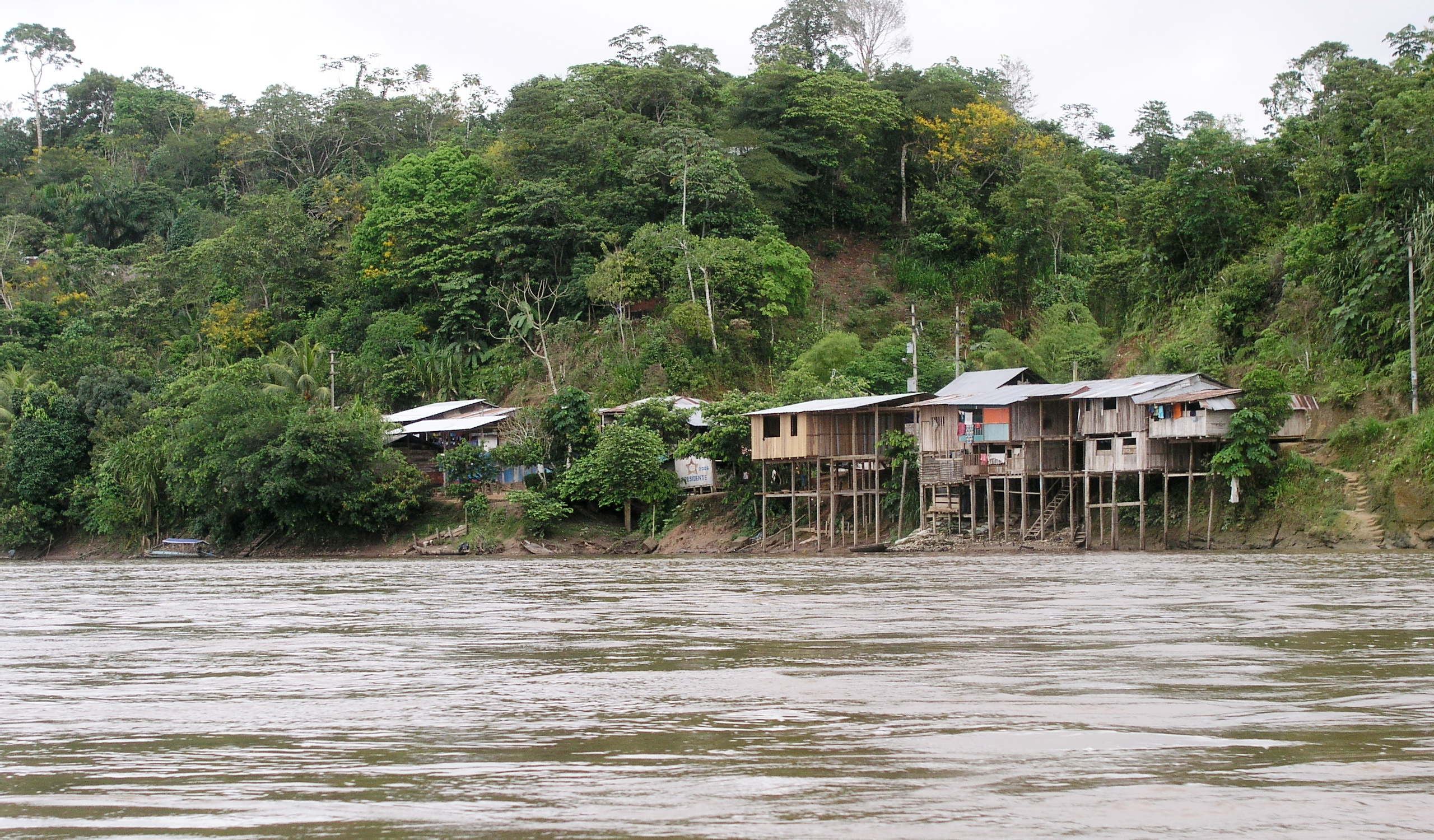

Location
- Country: Peru
- Region: Amazonas Region, Bongara Province, Condorcanqui Province

Physical characteristics
- Mouth: Marañón River

The Nieva River is a tributary of the Marañón River in Peru. It flows through the provinces Bongara and Condorcanqui of the Amazonas Region. Its length, from the east in the mountain range of Campanquiz to the mouth is approximately 150 kilometers.

== Tijae–Nieva River Protection Forest ==
An area of 363.48 km^{2} (140.34 mi^{2}) of the Nieva River watershed was declared a reserved zone. The Nieva River Reserved Zone is located in the Yambrasbamba District of the Bongara Province. Its aim is to conserve the high biodiversity of the Nieva River watershed and to provide the local people, especially the Awajún communities, with good drinking water.
