= Jamalca District =

Coordinates: 5°52′01″S 78°15′43″W

Jamalca Hamalka
- District
- Interactive map of Jamalca
- Country: Peru
- Region: Amazonas
- Province: Utcubamba
- Founded: February 5, 1861
- Capital: Jamalca

Government
  - Mayor: Ricardo Cabrera Bravo

Area
  - Total: 357.98 km^{2} (138.22 sq mi)
- Elevation: 1,201 m (3,940 ft)

Population (2005 census)
  - Total: 8,137
  - Density: 22.73/km^{2} (58.87/sq mi)
- Time zone: UTC-5 (PET)
- UBIGEO: 010705

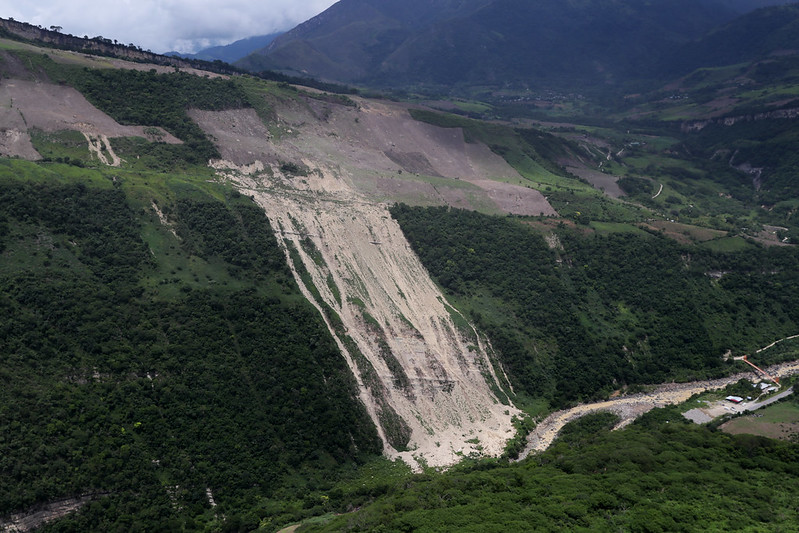
The Utcubamba River flowing through Jamalca District in Amazonas, Peru

Jamalca District is one of seven districts of the province Utcubamba in Peru.

== Climate ==
Climate data for Jamalca, elevation 1,173 m (3,848 ft), (1991–2020)
| Month | Jan | Feb | Mar | Apr | May | Jun | Jul | Aug | Sep | Oct | Nov | Dec | Year |
|---|---|---|---|---|---|---|---|---|---|---|---|---|---|
| Mean daily maximum °C (°F) | 26.1 (79.0) | 25.9 (78.6) | 25.9 (78.6) | 26.2 (79.2) | 26.0 (78.8) | 25.7 (78.3) | 25.6 (78.1) | 26.8 (80.2) | 27.7 (81.9) | 27.8 (82.0) | 27.8 (82.0) | 26.6 (79.9) | 26.5 (79.7) |
| Mean daily minimum °C (°F) | 17.9 (64.2) | 18.0 (64.4) | 18.1 (64.6) | 18.2 (64.8) | 18.1 (64.6) | 17.5 (63.5) | 17.2 (63.0) | 17.5 (63.5) | 18.0 (64.4) | 18.3 (64.9) | 18.3 (64.9) | 17.9 (64.2) | 17.9 (64.3) |
| Average precipitation mm (inches) | 130.7 (5.15) | 140.2 (5.52) | 195.3 (7.69) | 139.0 (5.47) | 87.1 (3.43) | 47.8 (1.88) | 31.0 (1.22) | 25.6 (1.01) | 52.6 (2.07) | 100.6 (3.96) | 128.2 (5.05) | 152.9 (6.02) | 1,231 (48.47) |
Source: National Meteorology and Hydrology Service of Peru

== See also ==
- Kuntur Puna
