= El Milagro District =

Coordinates: 5°38′06″S 78°33′40″W

El Milagro
- District
- Interactive map of El Milagro
- Country: Peru
- Region: Amazonas
- Province: Utcubamba
- Founded: May 30, 1984
- Capital: El Milagro

Government
  - Mayor: Eva Ganni Larrain Reyes

Area
  - Total: 313.89 km^{2} (121.19 sq mi)
- Elevation: 396 m (1,299 ft)

Population (2005 census)
  - Total: 6,527
  - Density: 20.79/km^{2} (53.86/sq mi)
- Time zone: UTC-5 (PET)
- UBIGEO: 010704

El Milagro District is one of seven districts of the province Utcubamba in Peru.
