= Utcubamba (river) =

Utcubamba Utkupampa
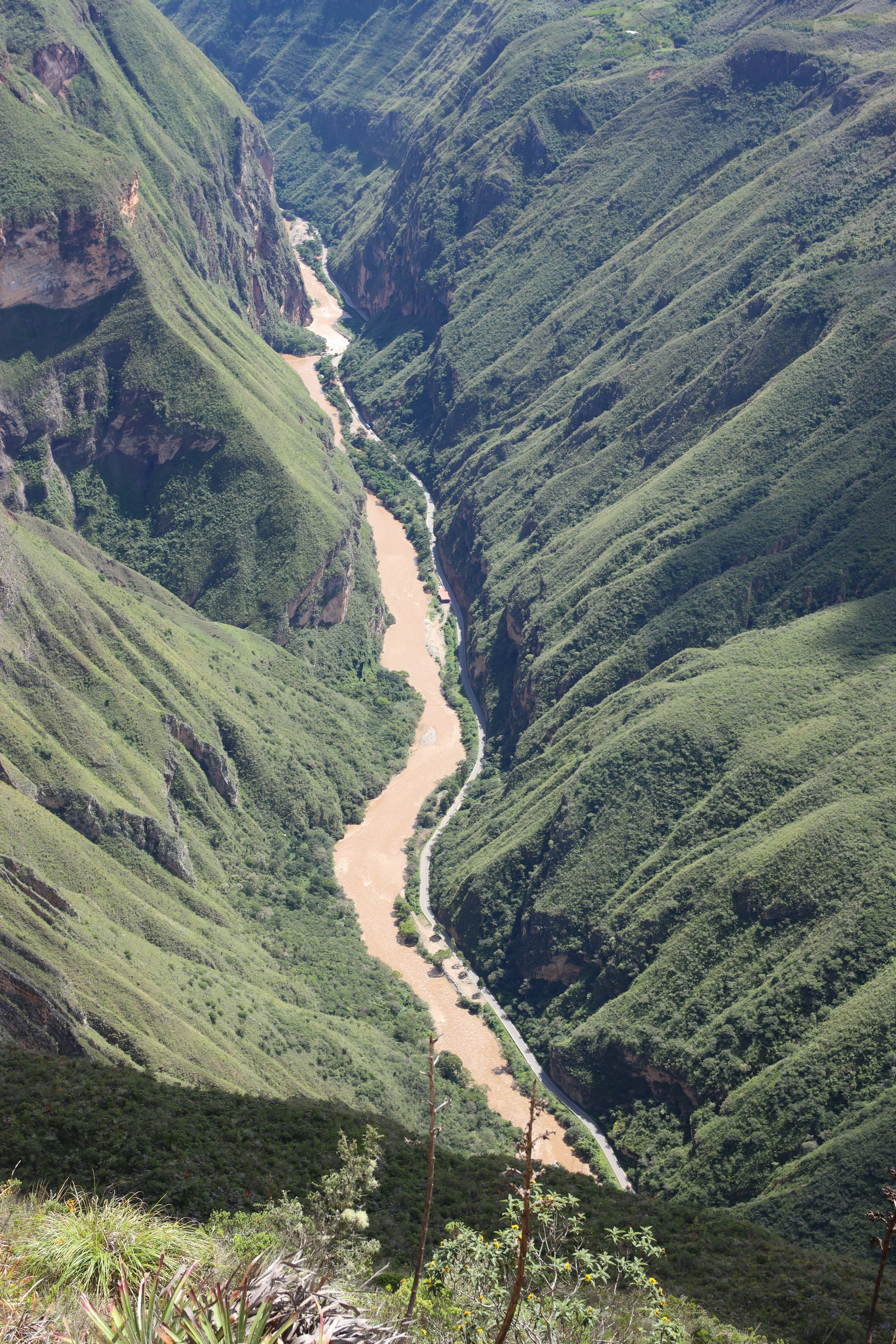
- View of Utcubamba River near Lámud
- Etymology: Quechua

Location
- Country: Peru
- Region: Amazonas Region

Physical characteristics
- Mouth: Marañón River

Utcubamba (hispanicized spelling) or Utkhupampa (Quechua utkhu cotton, pampa a large plain, "cotton plain") is a river in the Amazonas Region of Peru, located at 5°32′6″S 78°33′9″W. The name is a historical reference to the past agricultural practice of growing cotton in the Utcubamba Valley.

The Utcubamba River originates in the highlands of the central mountain range, then it flows north through the Amazonas Region before joining the Marañón River. The semitropical valley of the river is the former site of the pre-Columbian Chachapoyas culture and a popular tourist destination. Its many tributaries support the towns and farms of La Peca, Copallín, Cajaruro, Shipasbamba, La Florida, and Yambrasbamba.

Numerous hydroelectric dams have been built on the Utcubamba River from which a large portion of the Amazon Region derives its electricity. The Utcubamba River also passes through the Utcubamba Valley and is the source of irrigation for most of the cultivation done here. The tropical climate of the valley combined with the availability of water for the farms has helped to make this area one of the biggest producers of crops like maize, rice and banana.

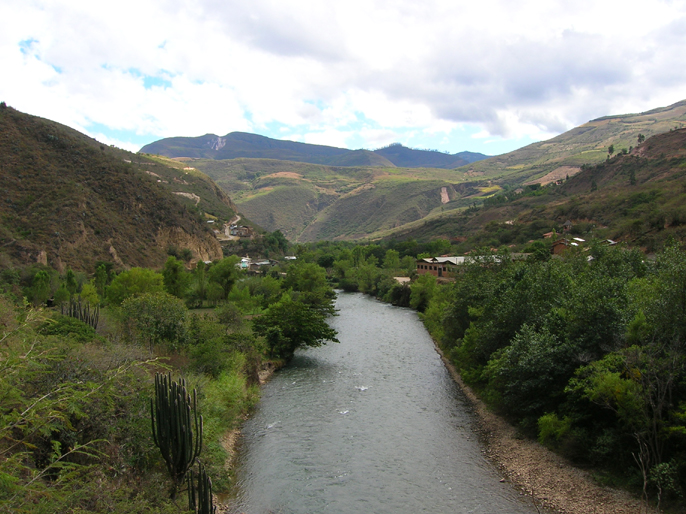
The Utcubamba River with the village El Tingo in the background

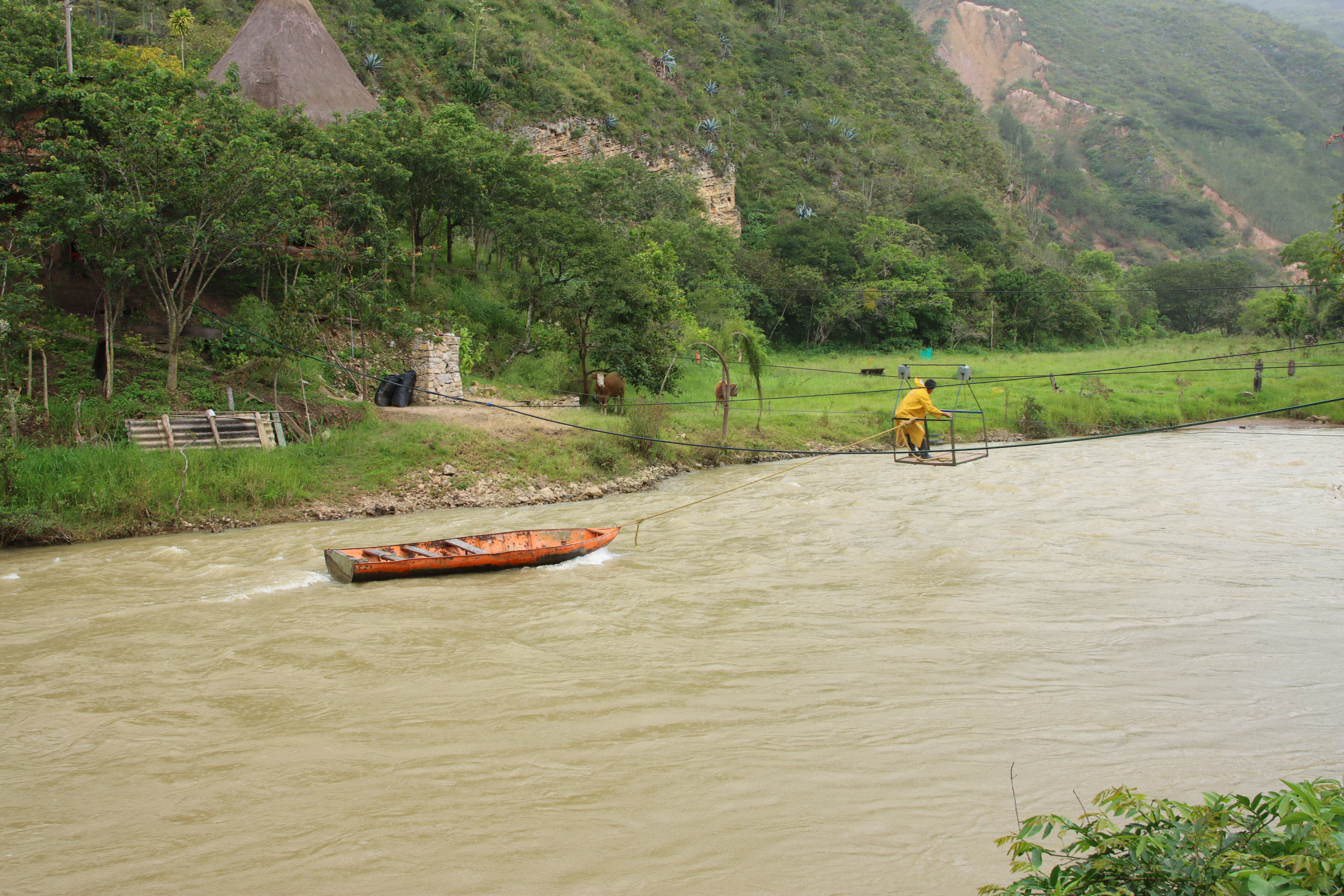
Cable ferry in El Tingo
