= Bongará province =

Bongará Province
- Province
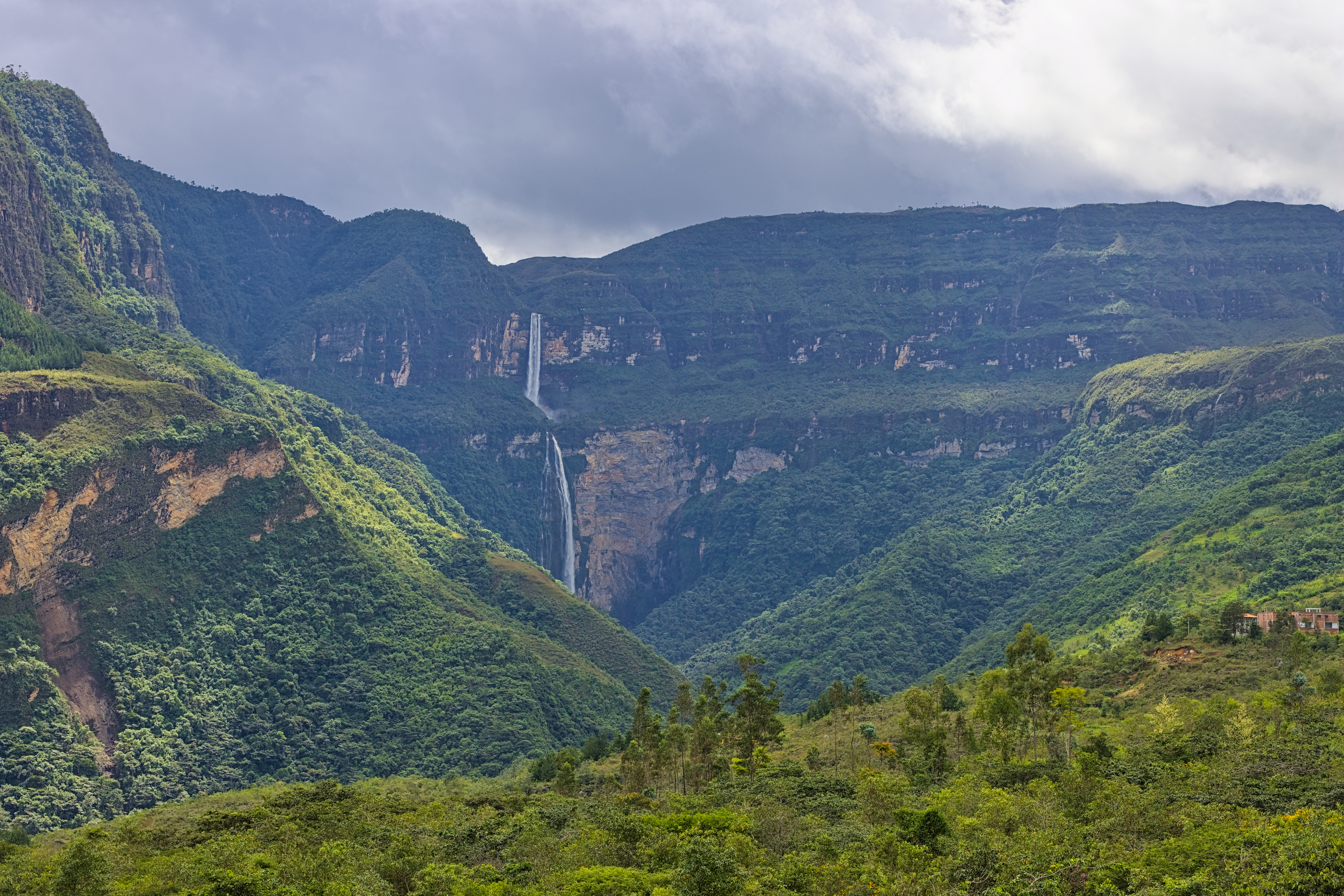
- View of the Gocta waterfall.

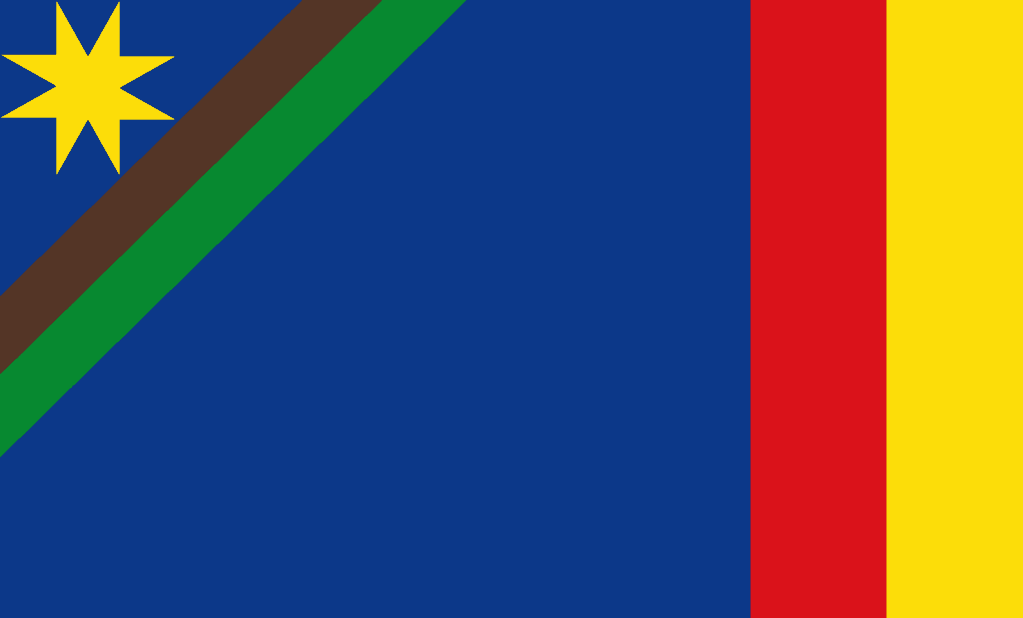
- Flag

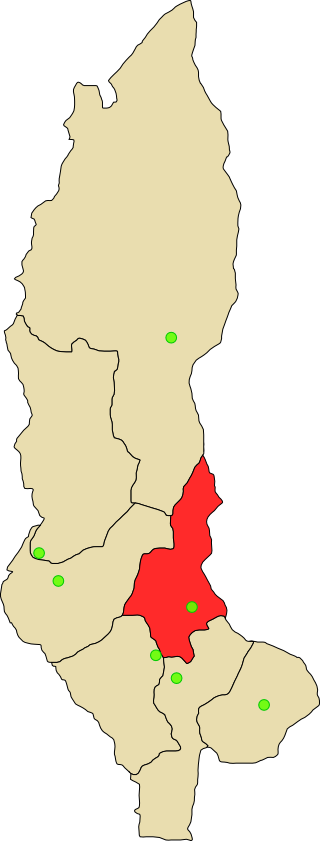
- Coordinates: 5°51′27″S 77°47′32″W
- Country: Peru
- Department: Amazonas Region

Area
  - Total: 2,870 km^{2} (1,110 sq mi)

Population (2017)
  - Total: 25,637
  - Density: 8.93/km^{2} (23.1/sq mi)

Bongará is a province of Peru's Amazonas Region. It borders to the north with the province of Condorcanqui, to the east with the San Martín Region and Loreto Region, to the south with the province of Chachapoyas and to the west with the provinces of Luya and Utcubamba.

It presents a varied geographical configuration. The branches of the Andes cross it from west to east, dividing it in three regions with proper characteristics:

- A swampy region, humid, that spreads between the narrow valley of the Utcubamba river and the quebrada (cliff) called Panhuaico. It has a cold climate. The zones of Jatunpampa, Kurupampa and Santa Cruz are located in this place. This vast region, because of the nature of its soil that has abundant natural grasslands, is called to be an excellent cattle zone.
- A region with many geographical accidents, stony soils, with high crags which heights fluctuate between 2,000 and 4,000 m. As an example of the important types of this orography, there are the mountain peaks] of Tocarpo, Cashul, Chambarán, Yumbam and Añacaja. This orographical system runs from south to north and its long ride gives place to a deep region (hoyada), which serves as a cradle to the picturesque lake Pumaqucha.
- Finally, an oriental branch goes towards the north, framing the Chiriaco or Imaza river and moves by the East. In this place, the rainforest opens itself to the districts of Yambrasbamba, Chisquilla and Corosha up to the limits with the San Martín Region. In this orographical chain there are the mountain peaks of Yerbabuena, Quitaya, Chiquipata, Calpotrero, Quilahuaita, Chonta Pozo and Ventana.

The hydrographic system of this province is represented by the basins of the Utcubamba river to which numerous gorges come together for both margins and serves as a limit with Luya Province. The Chiriaco or Imaza river crosses it on its South-Western part. The lake Pumaqucha is the principal part of this hydrography that was already described.

== Political division ==
Bongará is divided into twelve districts, which are:

District	Mayor
Jumbilla (Capital)	Jose Julian Ocampo
Chisquilla	Jose Natividad Bacalla Daza
Churuja	Romulo Flumencio Vargas Mas
Corosha	Wilfredo Goñas Guivin
Cuispes	Pedro Antonio Mori Rojas
Florida	Heraclito Mallap Melendez
Jazán	Walter Hugo Monteza Santillan
Recta	Serafin Mas Lopez
San Carlos	Ramiro Guivin Chochabot
Shipasbamba	Romelio Vilchez Dett
Valera	Pepe Perez Silva
Yambrasbamba	Edilberto Delgado Barboza

== See also ==
- Nieva River
- Pumaqucha
