= Churuja District =

Churuja
- District
- Interactive map of Churuja
- Coordinates: 6°01′S 77°55′W
- Country: Peru
- Region: Amazonas
- Province: Bongará
- Founded: December 30, 1944
- Capital: Churuja

Government
  - Mayor: Miguel Angel Meza Peralta

Area
  - Total: 33.34 km^{2} (12.87 sq mi)
- Elevation: 1,372 m (4,501 ft)

Population (2005 census)
  - Total: 242
  - Density: 7.26/km^{2} (18.8/sq mi)
- Time zone: UTC-5 (PET)
- UBIGEO: 010303

Churuja District is one of twelve districts of the province Bongará in Peru.
