= Lonya Grande District =

Coordinates: 6°06′00″S 78°28′01″W

Lonya Grande
- District
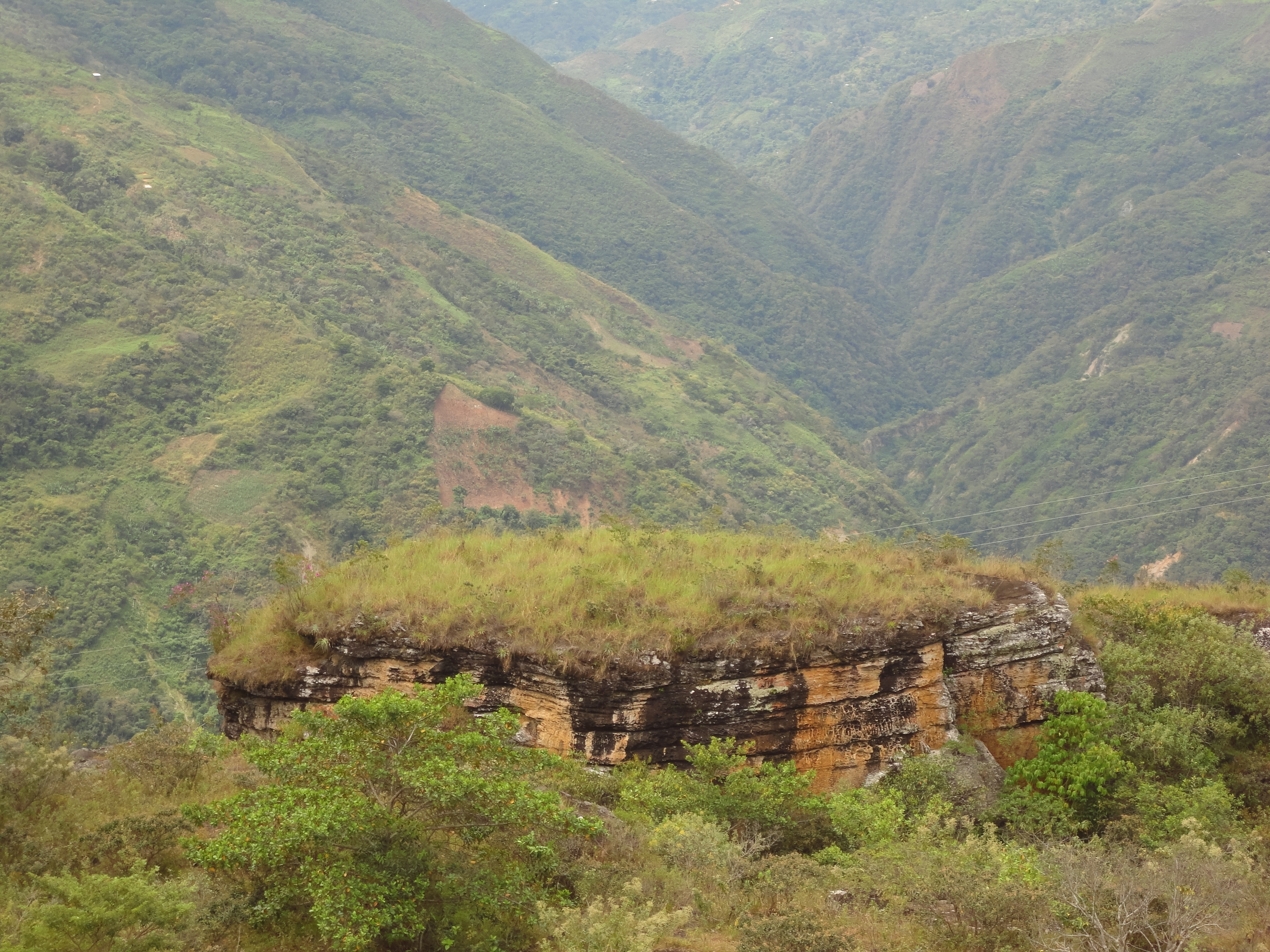
- A large rock in the Lonya Grande District
- Interactive map of Lonya Grande
- Country: Peru
- Region: Amazonas
- Province: Utcubamba
- Founded: February 5, 1861
- Capital: Lonya Grande

Government
  - Mayor: Antonio Homero Aguilar Tapia

Area
  - Total: 327.92 km^{2} (126.61 sq mi)
- Elevation: 1,200 m (3,900 ft)

Population (2005 census)
  - Total: 9,929
  - Density: 30.28/km^{2} (78.42/sq mi)
- Time zone: UTC-5 (PET)
- UBIGEO: 010706

Lonya Grande District is one of seven districts of the province Utcubamba in Peru.

== Climate ==
Climate data for El Palto, Lonya Grande, elevation 1,467 m (4,813 ft), (1991–2020)
Month	Jan	Feb	Mar	Apr	May	Jun	Jul	Aug	Sep	Oct	Nov	Dec	Year
Mean daily maximum °C (°F)	25.1 (77.2)	24.9 (76.8)	24.7 (76.5)	25.1 (77.2)	25.0 (77.0)	24.6 (76.3)	24.8 (76.6)	25.7 (78.3)	26.3 (79.3)	26.8 (80.2)	27.4 (81.3)	25.8 (78.4)	25.5 (77.9)
Mean daily minimum °C (°F)	17.0 (62.6)	17.0 (62.6)	17.1 (62.8)	17.1 (62.8)	17.0 (62.6)	16.4 (61.5)	16.0 (60.8)	16.2 (61.2)	16.6 (61.9)	17.1 (62.8)	17.0 (62.6)	16.9 (62.4)	16.8 (62.2)
Average precipitation mm (inches)	174.8 (6.88)	179.9 (7.08)	257.4 (10.13)	194.7 (7.67)	161.2 (6.35)	76.1 (3.00)	54.8 (2.16)	42.8 (1.69)	72.1 (2.84)	165.2 (6.50)	143.5 (5.65)	160.4 (6.31)	1,682.9 (66.26)
Source: National Meteorology and Hydrology Service of Peru

== See also ==
- Kuntur Puna
- Q'arachupa
