= Josetty Hurtado =

Peruvian actress and dancer

- Born: January 6, 1988 (age 38); Lima, Peru
- Occupations: Actress; Dancer; Model
- Years active: 1999–present
- Relatives: Gennesis Hurtado (sister) Andrés Hurtado (father)

Josetty Andrea Hurtado Huaytalla (born January 6, 1988) is a Peruvian actress and dancer known best for her role in the popular TV comedy sitcom "Mi Amor, el Wachimán" during Seasons 2 and 3, produced by América Televisión. Hurtado's appearance on the show was received well enough for an appearance on El Gran Show 2013 (season 1), which was the international (Peru) version of America's Dancing with the Stars, by the same production company. Hurtado is the daughter of Andrés Hurtado "Chibolín". After completing acting projects in Peru, Hurtado attended the New York Film Academy.

== Early life ==
Hurtado began working as a professional actor as a child in a stage play named The Little Mermaid at the Teatro Mocha Graña at the age of 6. Other theatre productions that followed include the musical Annie. At 11 years old, she was offered her first on screen acting job in the film 'Que será de mi'. Hurtado performed along with her father Andrés Hurtado “Chibolín” at the Montecarlo circus for 4 seasons during early childhood. She appeared in several more stage performances and also performed as a clown before being selected for a role in the TV show Mi Amor, el Wachimán.

== Filmography ==
List of film credits as an actress
Year	Title	Role	Notes
2013	Que Sera De Mi	Angela	Short film

List of television credits as an actress
Year	Title	Role	Notes
2011	Mi Amor El Wachiman	Perla Cordero Calvo	Season 2
2013	Cholo Powers	Samantha	
2014	Mi Amor El Wachiman	Perla Cordero Calvo	Season 3

List of reality show credits as self
Year	Title	Role	Notes
2012	El Gran Show: First Season	(Josetty, Fourth Place)	Dancer
