= Hanan Wak'a =

Coordinates: 5.9751°S 78.6337°W

Naming
- Language of name: Quechua

Geography
- Location: Peru, Amazonas Region, Utcubamba Province, Cumba District
- Parent range: Andes

Hanan Wak'a (Quechua hanan elevated, high, wak'a a local god of protection, a sacred object or place, "high wak'a", Hispanicized spelling Hananhuaca) is a mountain in the Andes of Peru. It is located in the Amazonas Region, Utcubamba Province, Cumba District, near the little village of Tactago.

Hanan Wak'a is a natural viewpoint with good views across the Marañón valley. Annually on June 24 a feast is celebrated on top of the mountain named Día de los Campesinos (Spanish for peasants' day). By the local people Hanan Wak'a is considered a place of protection.
