= Utcubamba province =

Coordinates: 5.756°S 78.441°W

Utcubamba
- Province
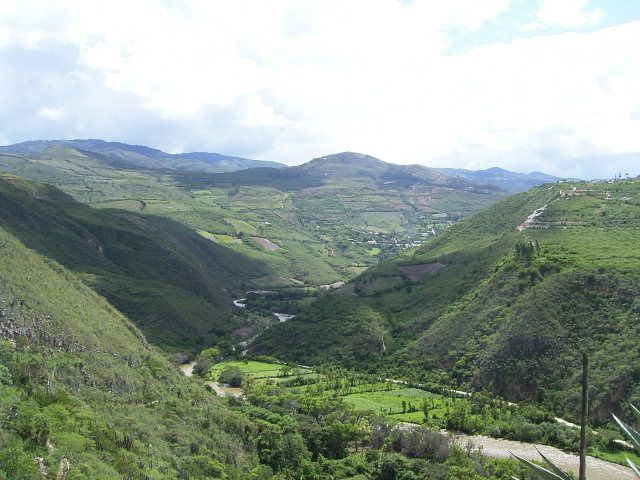
- Valley of the Utcubamba River

- Flag Coat of arms

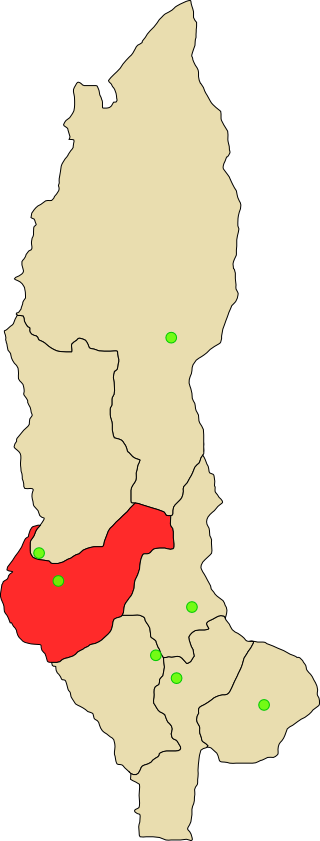
- Location of Utcubamba in the Amazonas Region
- Country: Peru
- Region: Amazonas
- Founded: May 30, 1984
- Capital: Bagua Grande

Government
  - Mayor: Segundo Quiterio Hernandez Vasquez (2007)

Area
  - Total: 3,859.93 km^{2} (1,490.33 sq mi)

Population 2005 census
  - Total: 118,367
  - Density: 30.6656/km^{2} (79.4235/sq mi)
- UBIGEO: 0107
- Website: www.muniutcubamba.gob.pe

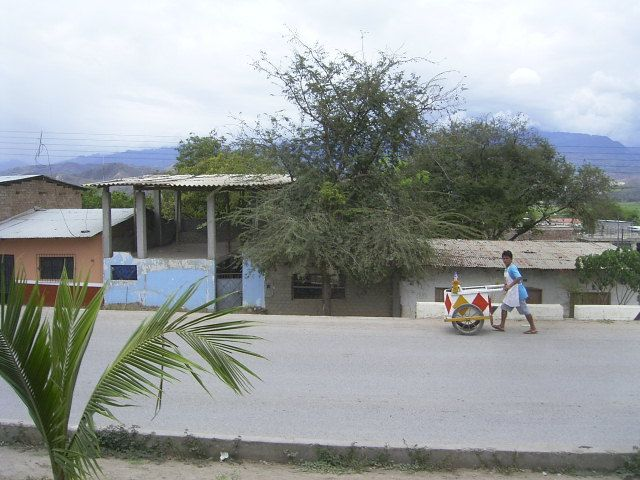
A view of the city Bagua Grande

Utcubamba (hispanicized spelling), in Quechua Utkhupampa (utkhu cotton, pampa a large plain, "cotton plain"), is one of seven provinces of the Amazonas Region, Peru. It was created by Law#-23843 on May 30, 1984. Its capital is Bagua Grande and its principal attraction is the Tourist Corridor of Utcubamba where the valley becomes notably closer forming "the canyon of Utcubamba". These conditions modify the climate in a substantial way and create a radical ecological shift. The area is fresh and fragrant and the orchids that are bountiful are unique in the world. Notably picturesque cascades are observed in the rocky vertical walls that the river has created. There are hot springs a few meters from El Ingenio bridge.

The selection of this corridor lies in the beauty of the scenery and in the tourist activities that can be generated in it, like canoeing, minor watercraft navigation, fishing and recreation sports.

== Political division ==
Utcubamba is divided into seven districts, which are:

District	Mayor
Bagua Grande	Milesio Vallejos Bravo
Cajaruro	Antero Dueñas Davila
Cumba	Elias Diaz Benavides
El Milagro	Eva Ganni Larrain Reyes
Jamalca	Ricardo Cabrera Bravo
Lonya Grande	Antonio Homero Aguilar Tapia
Yamón	Juan Torres Arévalo

== Places of interest ==
- Cordillera de Colán Reserved Zone
- Hanan Wak'a
- Kuntur Puna
- Q'arachupa
- Willka
