= Jazán District =

Coordinates: 6°1′S 77°55′W

Jazán
- District
- Interactive map of Jazán
- Country: Peru
- Region: Amazonas
- Province: Bongará
- Time zone: UTC-5 (PET)

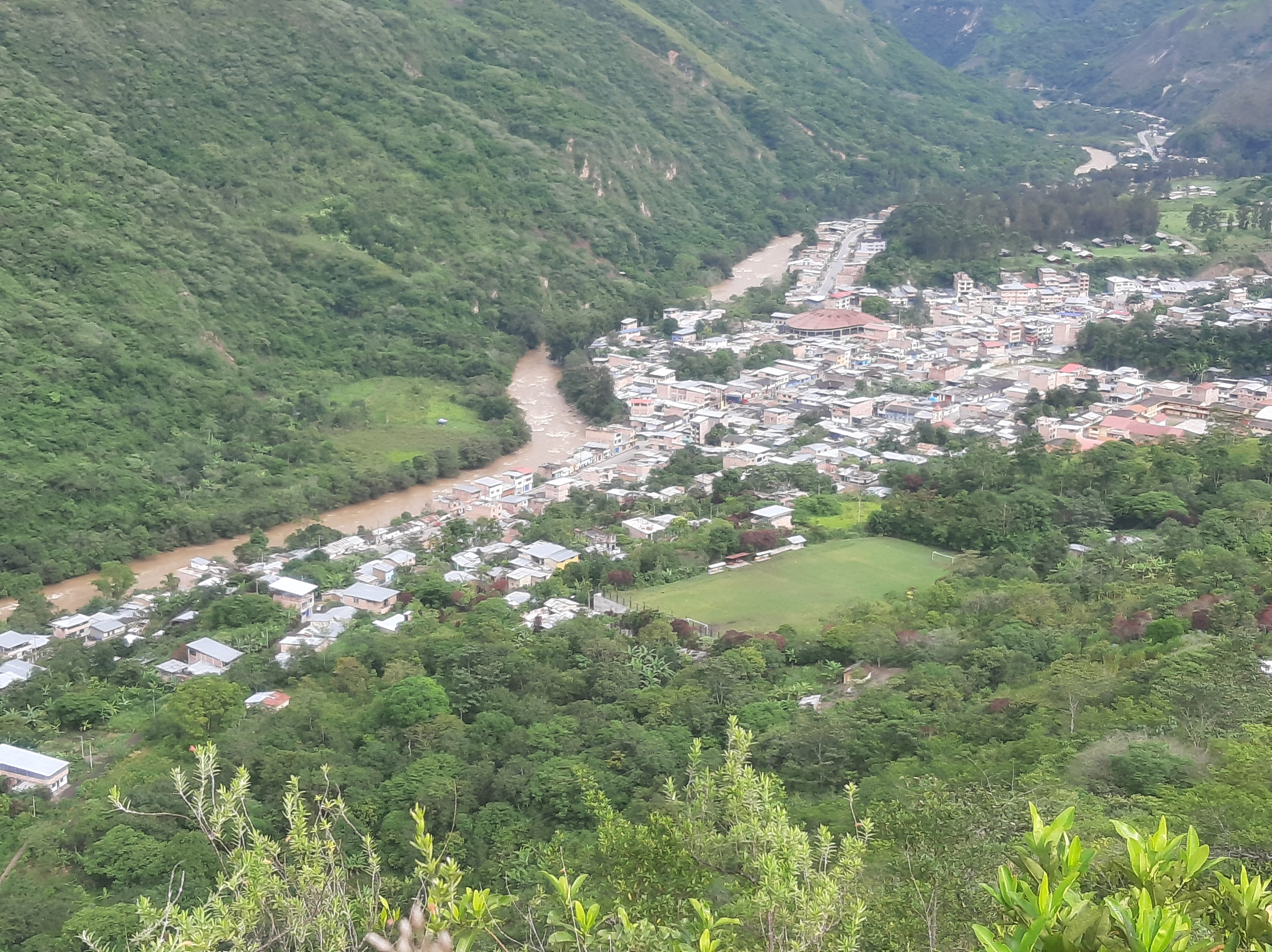
Panoramic view of the city of Pedro Ruíz Gallo, capital of the District of Jazán.

Jazán is a district of Bongará Province, Peru.

== Climate ==
Climate data for Jazán, elevation 1,354 m (4,442 ft), (1991–2020)
Month	Jan	Feb	Mar	Apr	May	Jun	Jul	Aug	Sep	Oct	Nov	Dec	Year
Mean daily maximum °C (°F)	26.5 (79.7)	26.1 (79.0)	25.7 (78.3)	25.4 (77.7)	25.2 (77.4)	24.7 (76.5)	24.8 (76.6)	26.0 (78.8)	26.4 (79.5)	27.0 (80.6)	27.5 (81.5)	26.7 (80.1)	26.0 (78.8)
Mean daily minimum °C (°F)	16.3 (61.3)	16.4 (61.5)	16.4 (61.5)	16.1 (61.0)	15.7 (60.3)	14.6 (58.3)	13.7 (56.7)	13.4 (56.1)	14.1 (57.4)	15.6 (60.1)	16.0 (60.8)	16.4 (61.5)	15.4 (59.7)
Average precipitation mm (inches)	54.2 (2.13)	63.2 (2.49)	102.8 (4.05)	101.5 (4.00)	78.5 (3.09)	57.9 (2.28)	50.2 (1.98)	38.7 (1.52)	69.4 (2.73)	81.0 (3.19)	60.8 (2.39)	68.4 (2.69)	826.6 (32.54)
Source: National Meteorology and Hydrology Service of Peru
