= Cumba District =

Coordinates: 5°55′52″S 78°39′47″W

Cumba Kumpa
- District
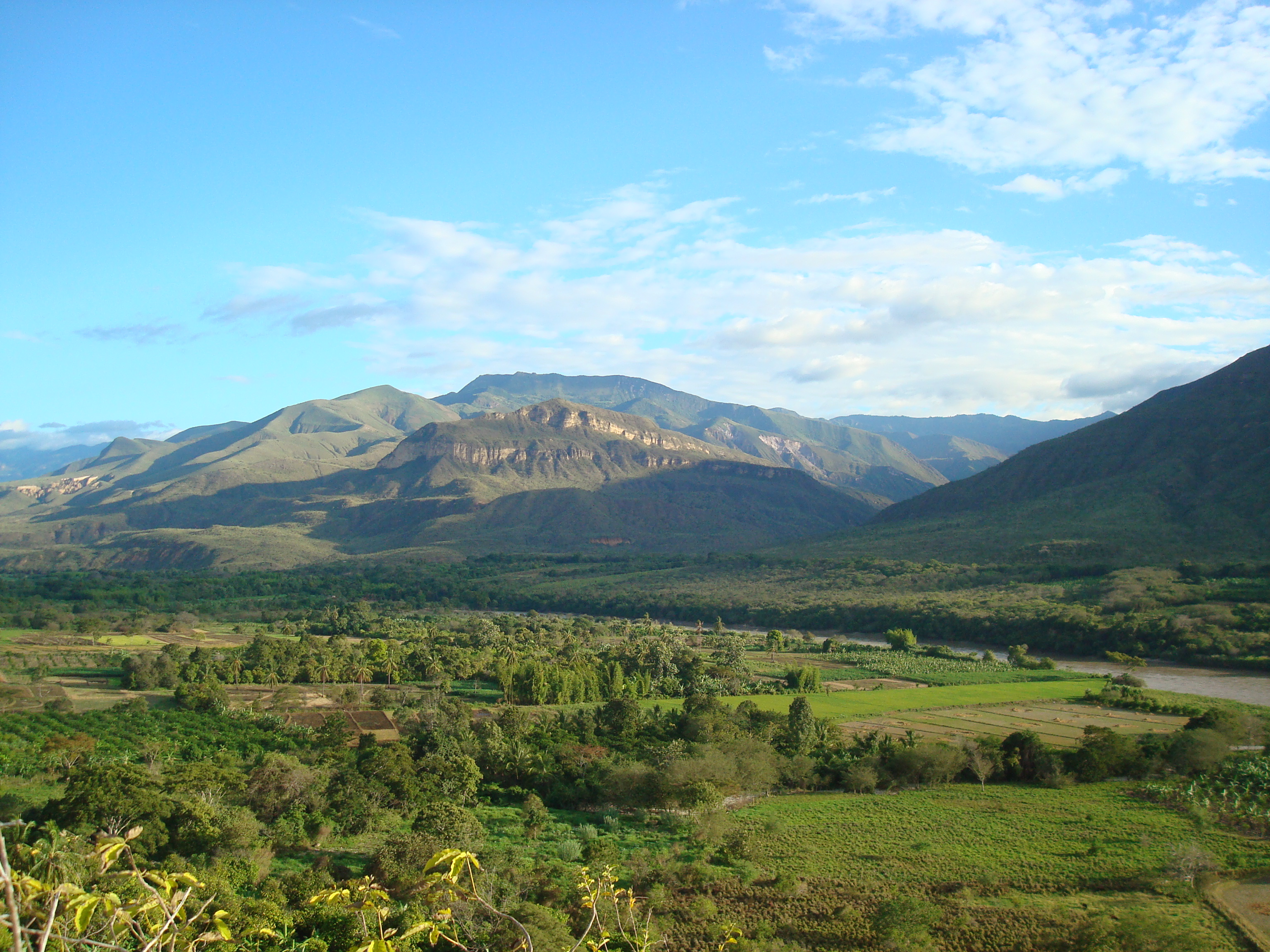
- Marañón River near Tactago, Cumba District
- Interactive map of Cumba
- Country: Peru
- Region: Amazonas
- Province: Utcubamba
- Founded: November 14, 1944
- Capital: Cumba

Government
  - Mayor: Elias Diaz Benavides

Area
  - Total: 292.66 km^{2} (113.00 sq mi)
- Elevation: 485 m (1,591 ft)

Population (2005 census)
  - Total: 9,794
  - Density: 33.47/km^{2} (86.68/sq mi)
- Time zone: UTC-5 (PET)
- UBIGEO: 010703

Cumba District is one of seven districts of the province Utcubamba in Peru.

== See also ==
- Hanan Wak'a
