= Recta District =

Coordinates: 5°54′00″S 77°43′59″W

Recta
- District
- Interactive map of Recta
- Country: Peru
- Region: Amazonas
- Province: Bongará
- Time zone: UTC-5 (PET)

Recta is a district of Bongará Province in Peru.
