= Kuntur Puna =

Mountain in Peru

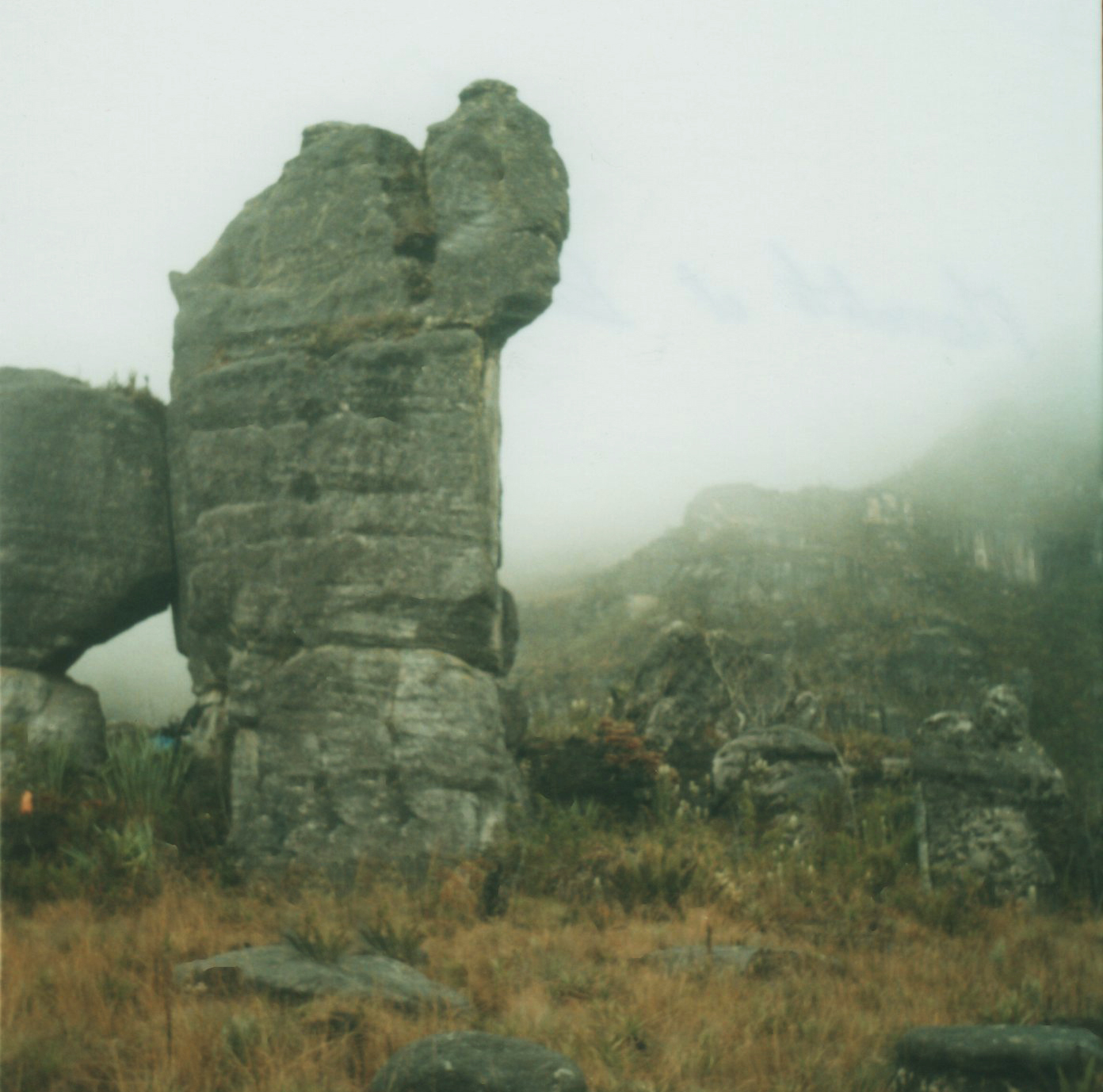
- A rock on the mountain Kuntur Puna

Highest point
- Coordinates: 6°03′53″S 78°17′27″W

Naming
- Language of name: Quechua

Geography
- Location within Peru
- Location: Peru, Amazonas Region, Luya Province, Utcubamba Province
- Parent range: Andes

Kuntur Puna (Quechua kuntur condor, puna an ecoregion near the Andes, "condor puna", Hispanicized spelling Condor Puna, Condorpuna, Cóndor Puna, Cóndorpuna) is a mountain in the Andes of Peru. It is located in the Amazonas Region, Luya Province, Conila District, and in the Utcubamba Province, in the districts Jamalca and Lonya Grande. It is one of the area's tallest mountains.

== See also ==
- Carachupa
