= Carachupa =

Archaeological site in Peru

Coordinates: 6.1213°S 78.4380°W

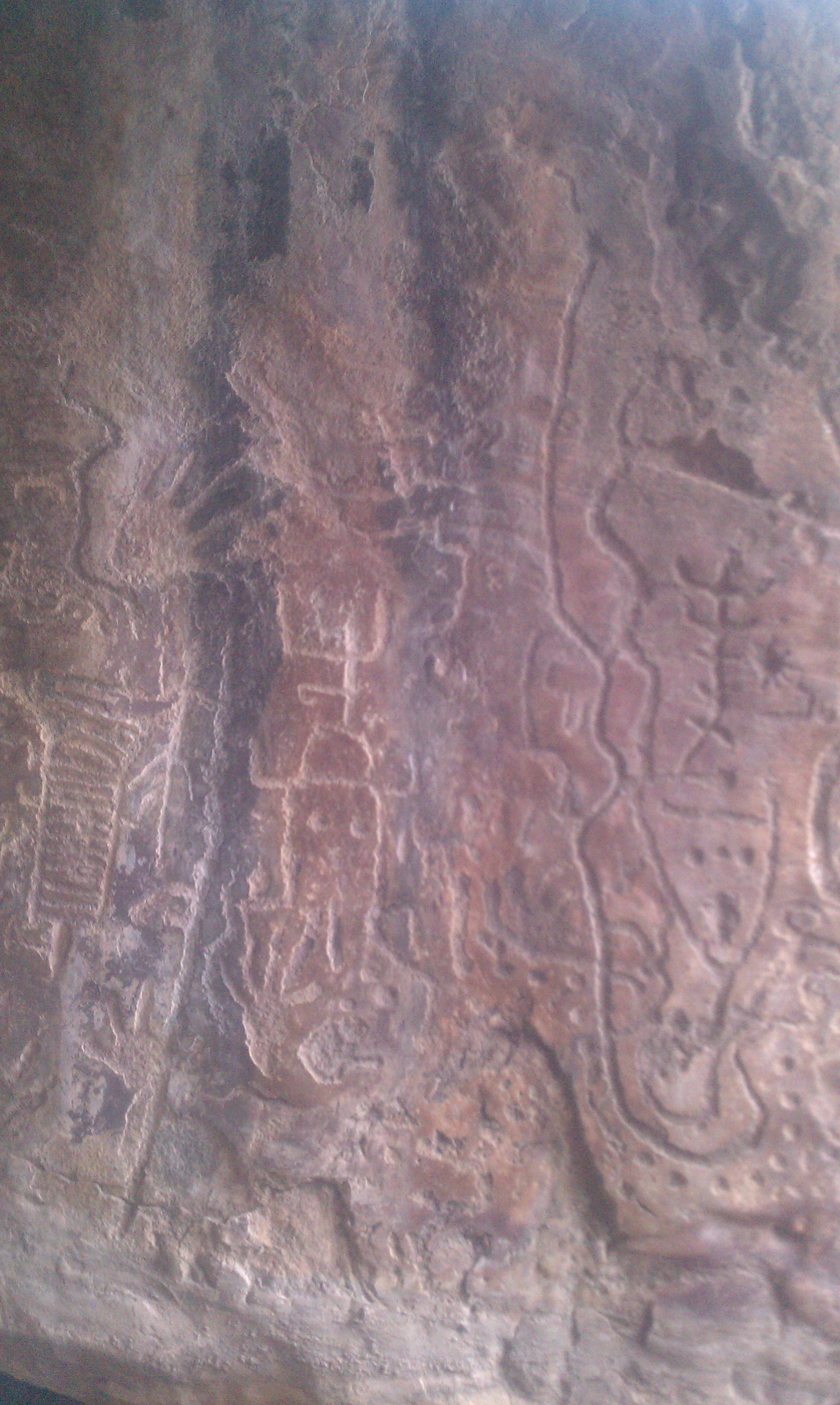
- Rock art at Carachupa

- Location within Peru
- Type: Rock art
- Location: Peru; Lonya Grande District, Amazonas Region

Carachupa (Quechua for opossum) is an archaeological site with rock art in Peru. It is located near the village of Carachupa, in Lonya Grande District, region of Amazonas.

== See also ==
- Kuntur Puna
