= Bagua Grande =

- Village
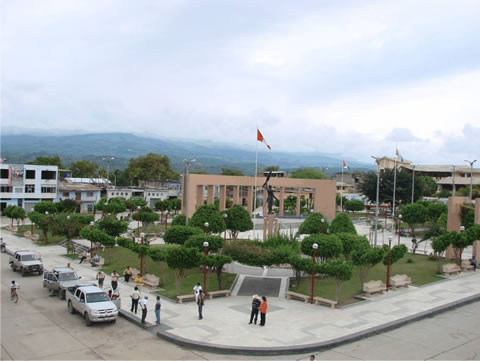
- Main plaza of Bagua Grande

- Flag Coat of arms
- Nickname: "Corazón de Amazonas" (Heart of Amazonas)
- Location within Peru
- Coordinates: 5°45′26″S 78°26′43″W
- Country: Peru
- Region: Amazonas
- Province: Utcubamba
- District: Bagua Grande

Government
  - Mayor: Hidelfonso Guevara Honores
- Elevation: 440 m (1,440 ft)

Population
  - Estimate (2015): 42,396
- Time zone: UTC-5 (PET)
- Website: www.muniutcubamba

Bagua Grande is a town in the Amazonas region in northern Peru. It is capital of Utcubamba Province, and of Bagua Grande District. Bagua Grande has an estimated 42,396 inhabitants, having changed from a rural to an urban area after experiencing much immigration in the 1960s. It is called by its inhabitants Corazón de Amazonas (Spanish, 'Heart of Amazonas').

== Geography ==
=== Climate ===
The urban area is located on a hillside by the river Utcubamba, now merged with Cajaruro District, is very warm, fertile and rainy for most of the year.

Climate data for Bagua Grande (Bagua Chica), elevation 397 m (1,302 ft), (1991–2020)
| Month | Jan | Feb | Mar | Apr | May | Jun | Jul | Aug | Sep | Oct | Nov | Dec | Year |
|---|---|---|---|---|---|---|---|---|---|---|---|---|---|
| Mean daily maximum °C (°F) | 32.4 (90.3) | 32.0 (89.6) | 32.0 (89.6) | 32.0 (89.6) | 31.6 (88.9) | 31.1 (88.0) | 31.2 (88.2) | 32.2 (90.0) | 33.0 (91.4) | 33.5 (92.3) | 33.7 (92.7) | 32.7 (90.9) | 32.3 (90.1) |
| Mean daily minimum °C (°F) | 22.0 (71.6) | 22.2 (72.0) | 22.4 (72.3) | 22.5 (72.5) | 22.3 (72.1) | 21.5 (70.7) | 20.9 (69.6) | 21.0 (69.8) | 21.6 (70.9) | 22.4 (72.3) | 22.4 (72.3) | 22.3 (72.1) | 22.0 (71.5) |
| Average precipitation mm (inches) | 46.5 (1.83) | 58.3 (2.30) | 80.3 (3.16) | 71.2 (2.80) | 73.3 (2.89) | 39.0 (1.54) | 32.5 (1.28) | 21.5 (0.85) | 29.4 (1.16) | 63.5 (2.50) | 56.7 (2.23) | 57.8 (2.28) | 630 (24.82) |
Source: National Meteorology and Hydrology Service of Peru

== Economy ==
The economy is based on trade and agricultural production, especially of very high-quality rice, corn and coffee; trade is active with the cities of Chiclayo, Jaén and the neighboring department of San Martín. It has minor industries, of hulled and rice mills and bottling carbonated water.

== Notable people ==
- José Lorenzo Zubiate Zegarra "Mondonguito" (1959–2026) Peruvian comedian
