= Chisquilla District =

Coordinates: 5°53′S 78°44′W

Chisquilla
- District
- Interactive map of Chisquilla
- Country: Peru
- Region: Amazonas
- Province: Bongará
- Founded: July 20, 1946
- Capital: Chisquilla
- Subdivisions: 16 populated places

Government
  - Mayor: Jose Natividad Bacalla Daza (2007)

Area
  - Total: 174.96 km^{2} (67.55 sq mi)
- Elevation: 2,070 m (6,790 ft)

Population (2005 census)
  - Total: 352
  - Density: 2.01/km^{2} (5.21/sq mi)
- Time zone: UTC-5 (PET)
- UBIGEO: 010302
- Website: munichisquilla.gob.pe

Chisquilla is one of 12 districts of the Bongará Province in the Amazonas region in Peru. Chisquilla, competitive, productive district, and, articulated to the national markets, with an agricultural sustainable diversity, promoter of an integral development, model of local management participativa and democratic; propitiating feeling of solidarity and cultural identification.

== Administrative division ==
The populated places in the district are:

- Chisquilla
- Señoria
- Chilac
- Chirosh
- California
- Callejon
- Puerto el Milagro
- Shotaran
- Chinchango
- Puerto Arturo
- Tialango
- Conejo
- Galurco
- Payo
- yerba Buena
- Ganso Azul

== Population ==
The population of Chisquilla is 352 people, 167 men and 185 women.
