= Andrés Hurtado =

Peruvian television personality (born 1966)

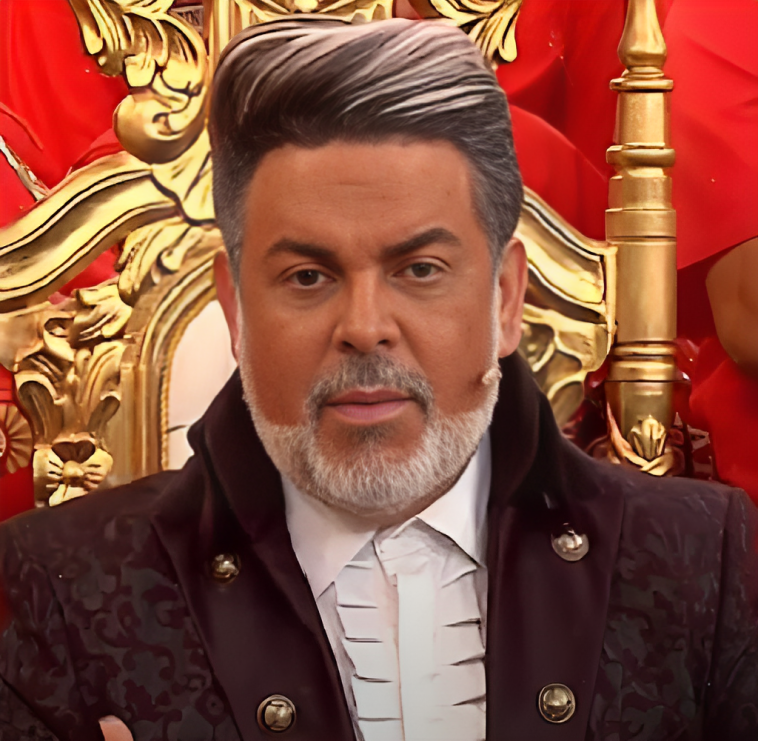
- Hurtado in 2020
- Born: Andrés Avelino Hurtado Grados; January 31, 1966 (age 60); Callao, Peru
- Occupation: Businessman · television producer · television presenter · comedian
- Years active: 1980-present
- Employer: Panamericana Televisión
- Height: 1.67 m (5 ft 6 in)
- Spouse: La India (m. 2019)
- Children: 3, including Josetty Hurtado
- Awards: Medal of the Peruvian Army (2016, retired in 2024)
- Criminal charges: Money laundering; influence peddling; active bribery
- Penalty: Pretrial detention (18 months)

Andrés Avelino Hurtado Grados (born January 31, 1966), also known by his stage name Chibolín, is a Peruvian television presenter, businessman, producer, dancer and comedian. He became famous for his humorous roles in the 1990s, in the programs Risas y salsa, Risas de América and Atrévete con Andrés. Once out of comedy, he began presenting the television program Porque hoy es sábado con Andrés, aired by Panamericana Televisión from 2014 to 2024, with charitable purposes for the lower classes.

Known for his flamboyant, egocentric and controversial personality, charitable works and luxurious life, Hurtado said he is an "envoy of God to save the earth" and that he is an extraterrestrial. He was accused of influence peddling, specific active bribery and money laudering, being sentenced to 18 months of preventive detention in October 2024.

== Biography ==
Hurtado was born on January 31, 1966 in the city of Callao, the youngest of seven siblings. Living in extreme poverty, he had to share a bed with three of his brothers. He studied at the Colegio San Antonio Marianistas and followed his primary school at the Colegio Don Bosco del Callao. With the dream of becoming a priest, Hurtado started as an altar boy at school, but was forced to abandon his studies to work. Despite this claim, information of the National Registry of Identification and Civil Status indicated that he had completed his secondary studies, denying another claim that the reason was ADHD.

Years later, Hurtado began working as a cleaner. When the house owners' daughter was crying because her clown had not arrived to her party, Hurtado dressed up to replace him, which turned out to be a success. Since then, he began working for clown companies under the stage name Chibolín. One version by Rosi Marinho, a children's entertainer nicknamed "Rosibetty", stated that the stage name was adopted when Hurtado was 14 years old. He was then a dancer in the circus group "El Principito", owned by Bertha León, leading him to explore the artistic environment, standing out in café theaters and performing cabaret shows.

=== Television career ===
With the help of Gisela Valcárcel, Hurtado entered the world of television in the last decades of the 20th century. After traveling to the United States, he returned to Peru, where he parodied personalities of Peruvian and foreign popular culture. Notable among them were then-first lady Keiko Fujimori, actress and television presenter Camucha Negrete, child dancer Yola Polastri, and fictional characters such as María Mercedes and Luz Clarita. At the time, Hurtado said that he was not capable of playing men's roles, but rather "effeminate" or women's roles.

He was part of the cast of Risas y salsa from 1994 to 1996 and later in Risas de América from 1997 to 1999. He considered the latter as his "model of comedy show" to entertain the public in the future. In addition, he was a member of Guillermo Guille's generation, to whom he admitted that his presence "practically destroyed my life."

In 2009, he left television to become a businessman. He ran his travel agency, in which he served high-ranking officials of the country such as the former mayor of Miraflores District, Lima, Luis Molina. He also stood out for participating in events with the police, according to Víctor Zanabria, for some years. Since then, he has had very few appearances as a comedian, such as his participation in El gran show in 2015, in which he again parodied charismatic characters such as Luz Clarita and Yola Polastri.

Between 2014 and 2024, he hosted her show Porque hoy es sábado con Andrés. In the year it closed, Hurtado claimed that the show generated monthly revenues of between 10,000 and 300,000 soles thanks to sponsors.

In 2023, he appeared in the reality show “La casa de Magaly” on the Magaly TV show. In a controversial episode, he carried out acts of transphobia against Etza Reátegui by demanding that she be called by the name on her national identity document and not by the one she has chosen.

In 2019, he married Puerto Rican singer La India.

== Controversies ==
=== Chibolín case ===
In 2024, Hurtado was involved in a judicial scandal involving the Siucho family. One of the family members, Ana Siucho Neira (wife of footballer Edison Flores), accused him of influence peddling on the program Beto a saber. Siucho Neira also accused him of mediating the payment of one million dollars in bribes together with the money laundering prosecutor, Elizabeth Peralta, who was investigated for her ties to the Cuellos Blancos. As a result, the Judiciary issued an order preventing Hurtado and the prosecutor from leaving the country for 15 days. In September 2024, the Prosecutor's Office declared the judicial case of Hurtado and those close to him "complex". It announced that two simultaneous investigations would be carried out for eight months related to money laundering. Days later, the Judiciary authorized Hurtado to be in preventive detention for 18 months.

==== Other problems with justice ====
In July 2015, Hurtado was accused of defrauding a couple of businessmen of USD 185,000 to create the Chibolín and Josetty Circus. The following month, the Public Ministry filed the complaint against Hurtado.

=== Dissemination of alleged treatment against COVID-19 ===
In April 2020, Hurtado spread on his television program and through his social networks that water with vinegar and lemon eliminated the virus from the throat. Days later, the presenter apologized due to a confusion when it was wrongly interpreted as a treatment for throat infection and not against COVID-19.
