= Gocta Cataracts =

Waterfall in Bongara, Amazonas, Peru

Gocta waterfall
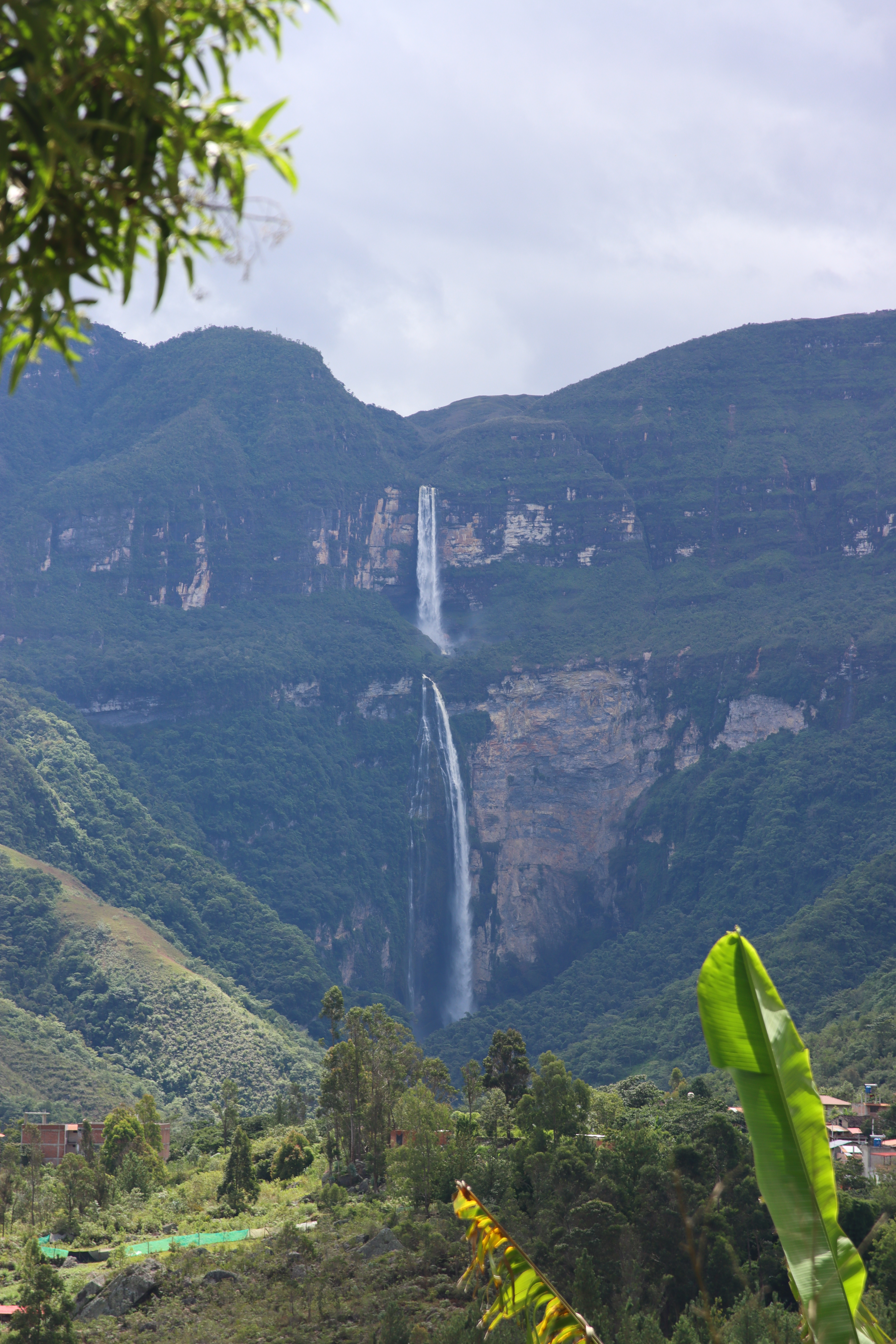
- Gocta Falls seen in 2023

- Location within Peru Location within South America
- Location: Valera District, Bongará, Amazonas, Peru
- Coordinates: 6.0223°S 77.8865°W
- Type: Cataract
- Total height: 771 m (2,530 ft)
- Number of drops: 2

Gocta (Spanish: Catarata del Gocta) is a perennial waterfall with two drops located in Peru's province of Bongara in Amazonas, approximately 771 kilometres (479 mi) to the northeast of Lima. It flows into the Cocahuayco River. Although the waterfall had been well known to locals for centuries (it is in full view of a nearby village), its existence was not made known to the world until after an expedition made in 2002 by a German, Stefan Ziemendorff, with a group of Peruvian explorers. The waterfall, which can be seen from several kilometers away, has been christened Gocta Falls.

At the time of the discovery, Ziemendorff successfully persuaded the Peruvian government to map the falls and to measure their height. On 11 March 2006, following his third expedition to the falls, he held a press conference, the contents of which were published by several of the world's wire services. He stated that the total height was measured at 771 metres (2,530 ft), which ranked Gocta as the third-tallest free-leaping waterfall in the world after Angel Falls in Venezuela and Tugela Falls in South Africa. However, this was apparently based on outdated and incomplete information gleaned from the National Geographic Society, and Ziemendorff's comments as to the waterfalls' ranking have since been widely disputed. Citing various encyclopedias, reference books, and webpages accessible through Google, Gocta Cataracts are unofficially listed as the world's fifth-tallest, after adding Ramnefjellsfossen (Norway) and Mongefossen (Norway). Furthermore, The World Waterfall Database list of the World's Tallest Waterfalls ranks Gocta as the 18th tallest.

The daily El Comercio said that the impressive waterfall had remained unknown to outsiders until its announcement, because local people feared the curse of a beautiful blond mermaid who lived in its waters, if they revealed its whereabouts. "The falls are supposed to be protected by a white-haired mermaid-like spirit whose hair can be seen flowing down the massive U-shaped walls at the bottom of the falls." On 13 March 2006, the Peruvian government announced to the press that the area surrounding the falls would be developed as a tourist attraction, with a target date sometime in mid-2007. A small hotel was built 6 miles (10 km) from the base of the waterfall, with all rooms having views of the waterfall. Tourists can now hike the trails by foot or horse to the misty base of the waterfall. The nearby town of Chachapoyas is located at an altitude of 2,235 meters (7,333 feet). The waterfall is at a slightly higher altitude and thus clouds can be seen to occasionally eclipse part of the view.

== See also ==
- List of waterfalls
- List of waterfalls by height
