= Cajaruro District =

Coordinates: 5°44′10″S 78°25′34″W

Cajaruro Kasharuru
- District
- Interactive map of Cajaruro
- Country: Peru
- Region: Amazonas
- Province: Utcubamba
- Founded: September 17, 1964
- Capital: Cajaruro

Government
  - Mayor: Felipe Castillo Sanchez

Area
  - Total: 1,763.23 km^{2} (680.79 sq mi)
- Elevation: 490 m (1,610 ft)

Population (2005 census)
  - Total: 30,633
  - Density: 17.373/km^{2} (44.996/sq mi)
- Time zone: UTC-5 (PET)
- UBIGEO: 010702

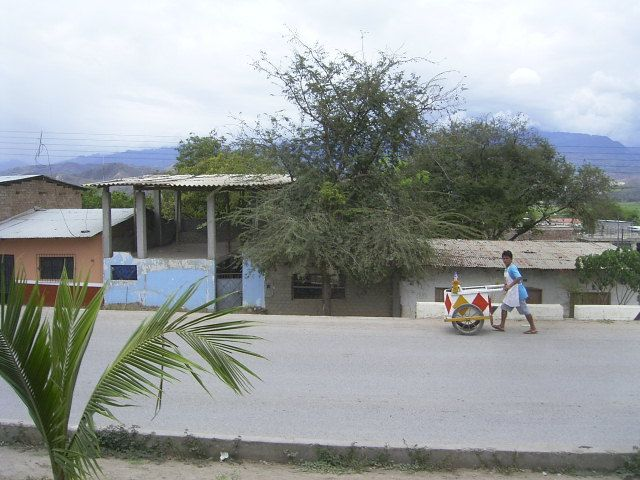

Cajaruro District is one of seven districts of the province Utcubamba in Peru.

== See also ==
- Willka
