= Shipasbamba District =

Coordinates: 5°54′25″S 78°02′35″W

Shipasbamba
- District
- Interactive map of Shipasbamba
- Country: Peru
- Region: Amazonas
- Province: Bongará
- Time zone: UTC-5 (PET)

Shipasbamba is a district in Bongará Province, Peru.
