= Yambrasbamba District =

Coordinates: 5°45′S 77°54′W

Yambrasbamba
- District
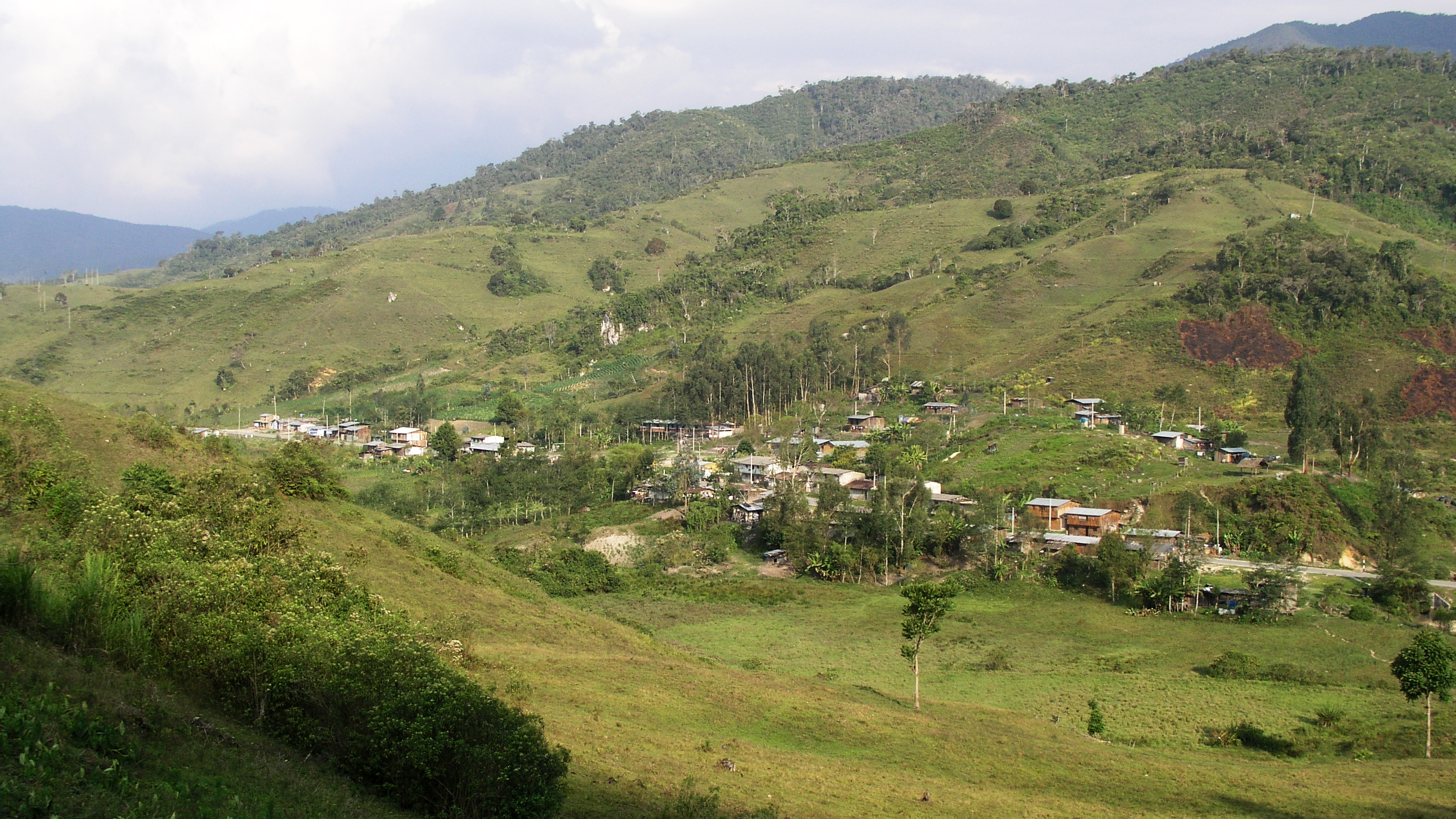
- Yambrasbamba District
- Interactive map of Yambrasbamba
- Country: Peru
- Region: Amazonas
- Province: Bongará
- Time zone: UTC-5 (PET)

Yambrasbamba is a district of Bongará Province in Peru. The district occupies an area of 1.715,96 km^{2}. It was created on December 26, 1870, and has a population of approximately 12,000 inhabitants. The capital of the district is the city of Yambrasbamba, at an elevation of 1,903 meters on above sea level. The city has an attractive ambience with varieties of orchids and large trees. It is crossed by the Imaza River. The population of the district is primarily rural and of mixed origin. The population devotes themselves to raising cattle, to the production of milk and to the culture of yacón, corn, carrots, swallows and coffee.

== Principal attractions ==
- The Hope. A Hydroelectric project that provides power to the district.
- El Progreso

== See also ==
- Nieva River
