= Jumbilla District =

Coordinates: 5°51′27″S 77°47′32″W

Jumbilla
- District
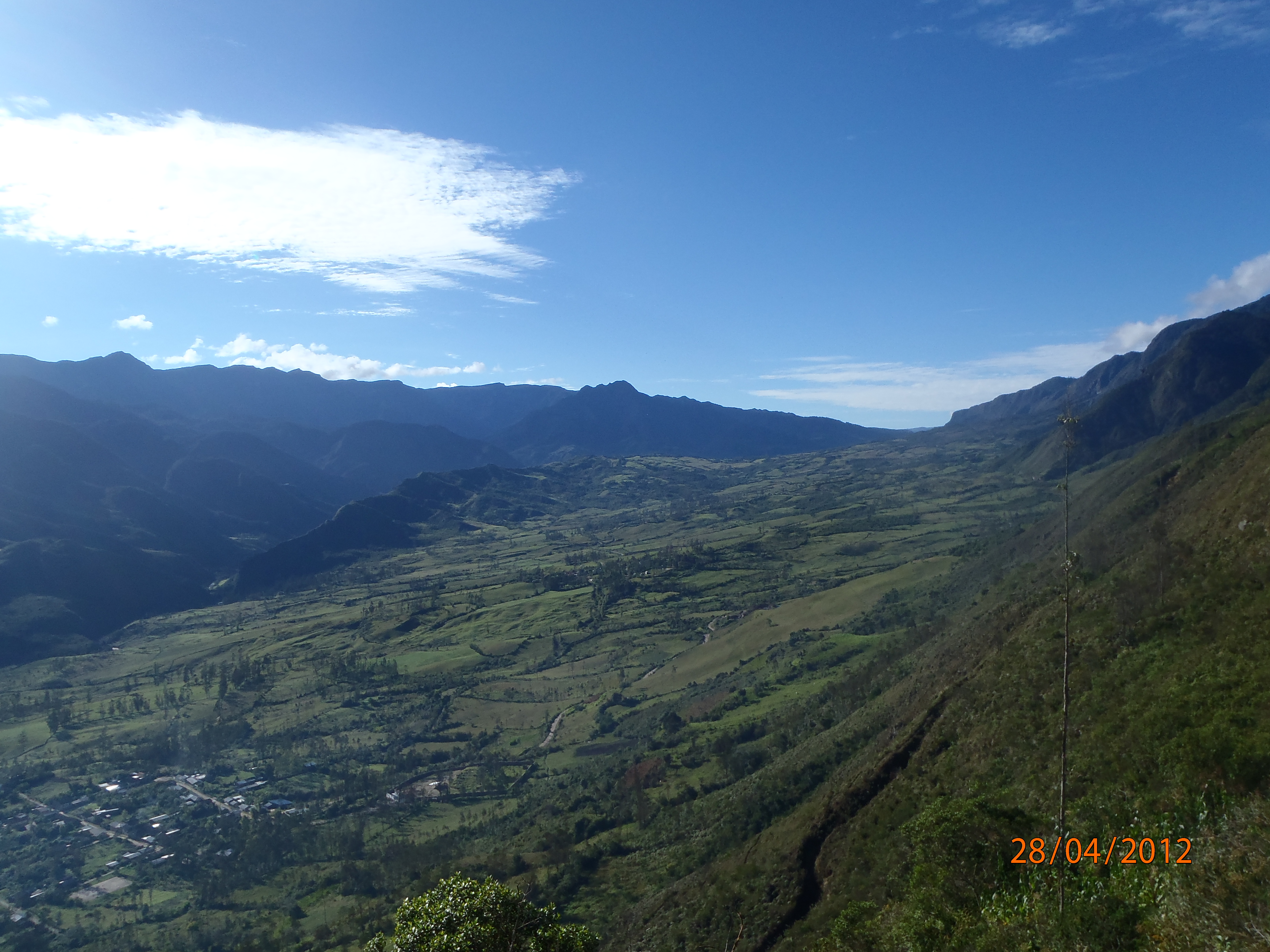
- Interactive map of Jumbilla
- Country: Peru
- Region: Amazonas
- Province: Bongará
- Capital: Jumbilla
- Time zone: UTC-5 (PET)

Jumbilla is a district of Bongará Province, Peru.
