= Purunllacta, Soloco =

Archaeological site in Peru

Coordinates: 6.2851°S 77.7129°W

Purunllacta
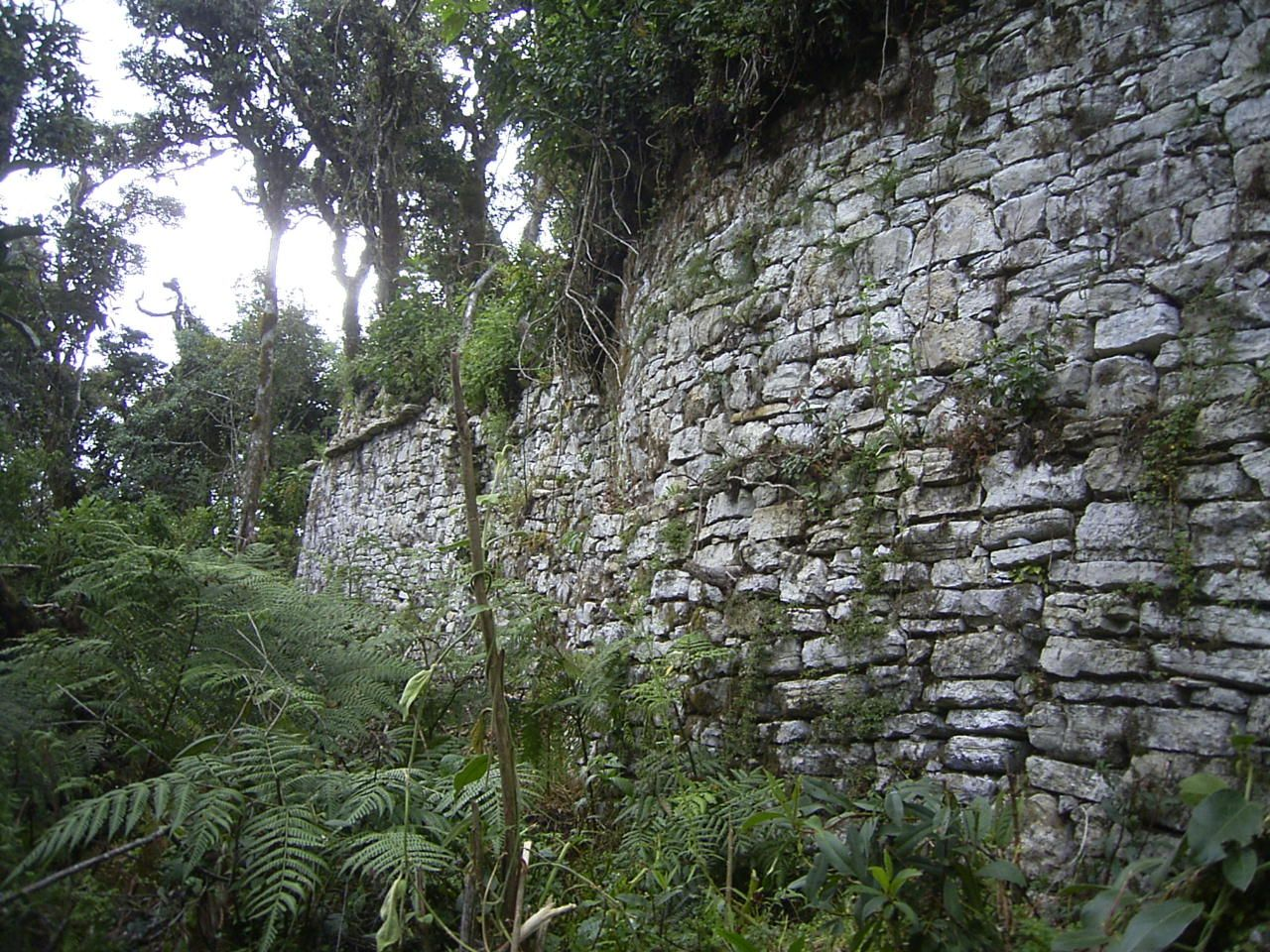
- A wall of the fortress in Soloco

- Location within Peru
- Location: Peru
- Region: Amazonas Region, Chachapoyas Province, Soloco District

Purunllacta or Purum Llacta (possibly from Quechua purum, purun savage, wild / wasteland, llaqta place (village, town, city, country, nation) is an archaeological site in Peru. It is situated in the Amazonas Region, Chachapoyas Province, Soloco District, southwest and near the archaeological site of Purum Llaqta of the Cheto District.

== See also ==
- Machu Pirqa
- Quchapampa
