= Molinopampa District =

Molinopampa
- District
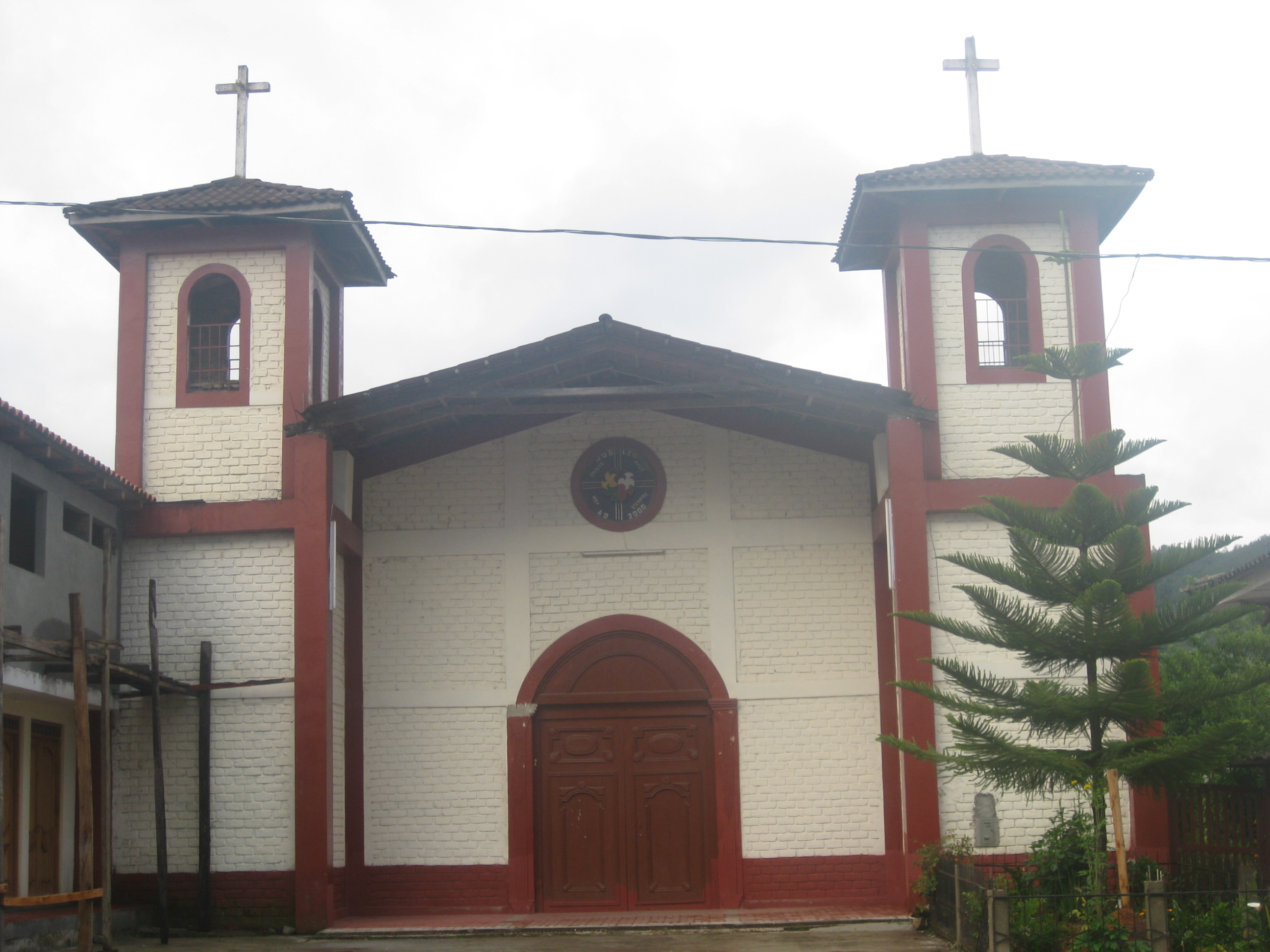
- Church of Molinopampa
- Interactive map of Molinopampa
- Coordinates: 6°11′45″S 77°38′15″W
- Country: Peru
- Region: Amazonas
- Province: Chachapoyas
- Founded: February 5, 1861
- Capital: Molinopampa

Government
  - Mayor: Zonia María Negron Tafur

Area
  - Total: 333.86 km^{2} (128.90 sq mi)
- Elevation: 2,407 m (7,897 ft)

Population (2005 census)
  - Total: 2,583
  - Density: 7.737/km^{2} (20.04/sq mi)
- Time zone: UTC-5 (PET)
- UBIGEO: 010114

Molinopampa is a district of the Chachapoyas Province, Peru. The district is located at an altitude of 2,407 m above sea level, covers an area of 400 km^{2}. It is located at the right bank of the Ventilla River.

Molinopampa offers many attractions such as ruins and the River Sonche.

To the north the district borders the Quinjalca District (Chachapoyas) and Granada District (Chachapoyas), to the southeast with the Longar District, to the south-west the Cheto District (Chachapoyas).

== Gallery ==
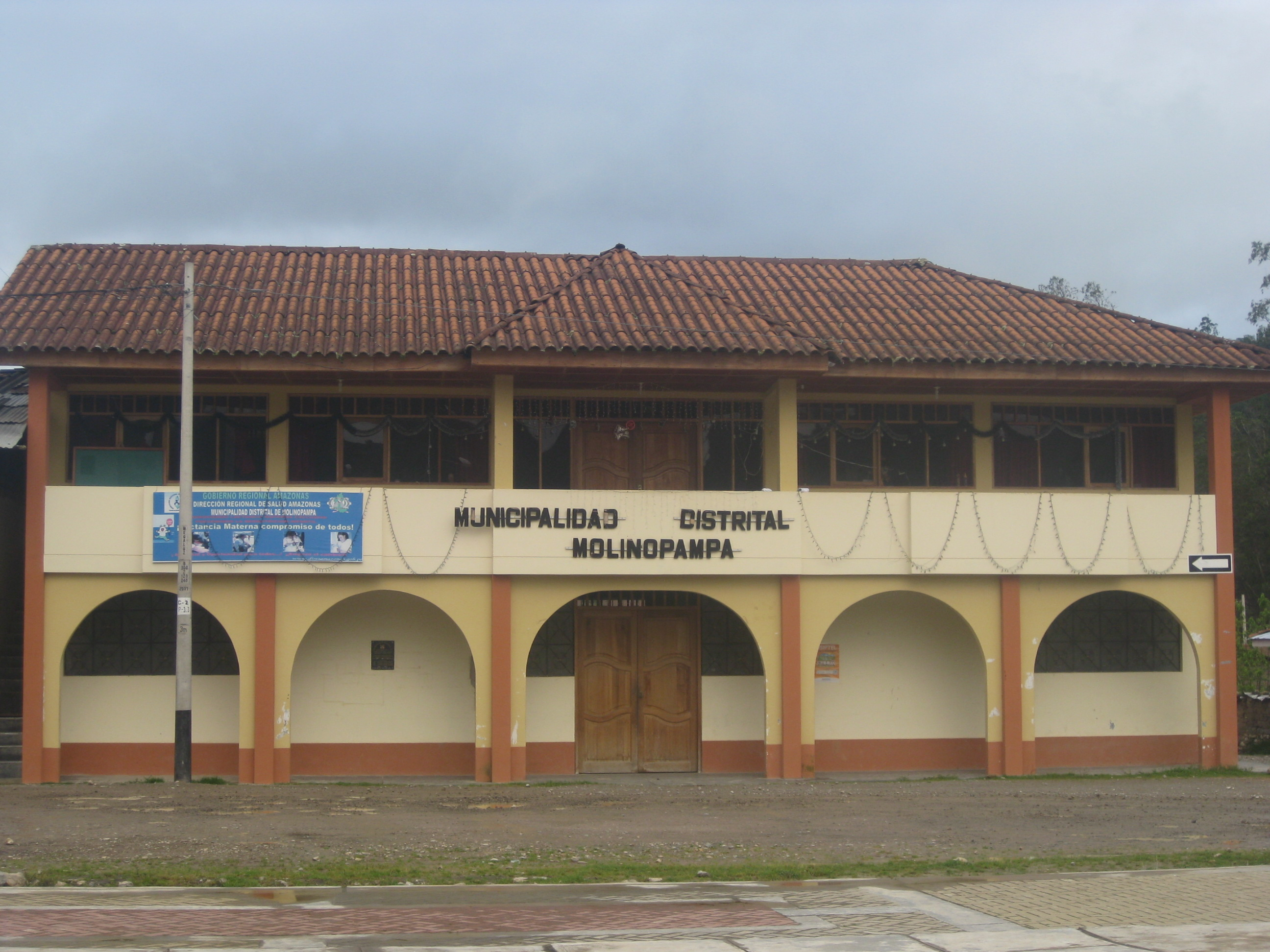
Municipalidad de Molinopampa

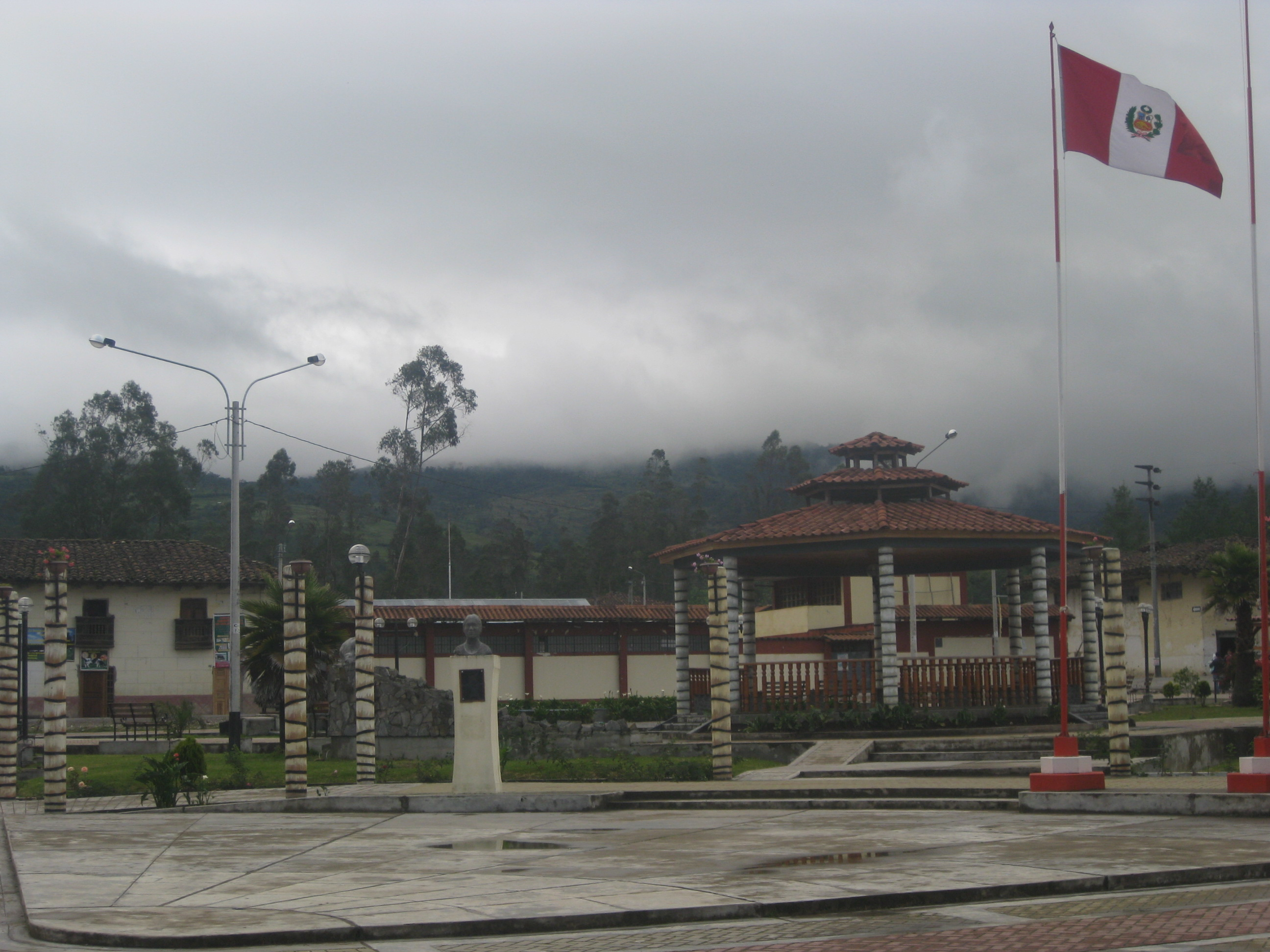
Main square of Molinopampa

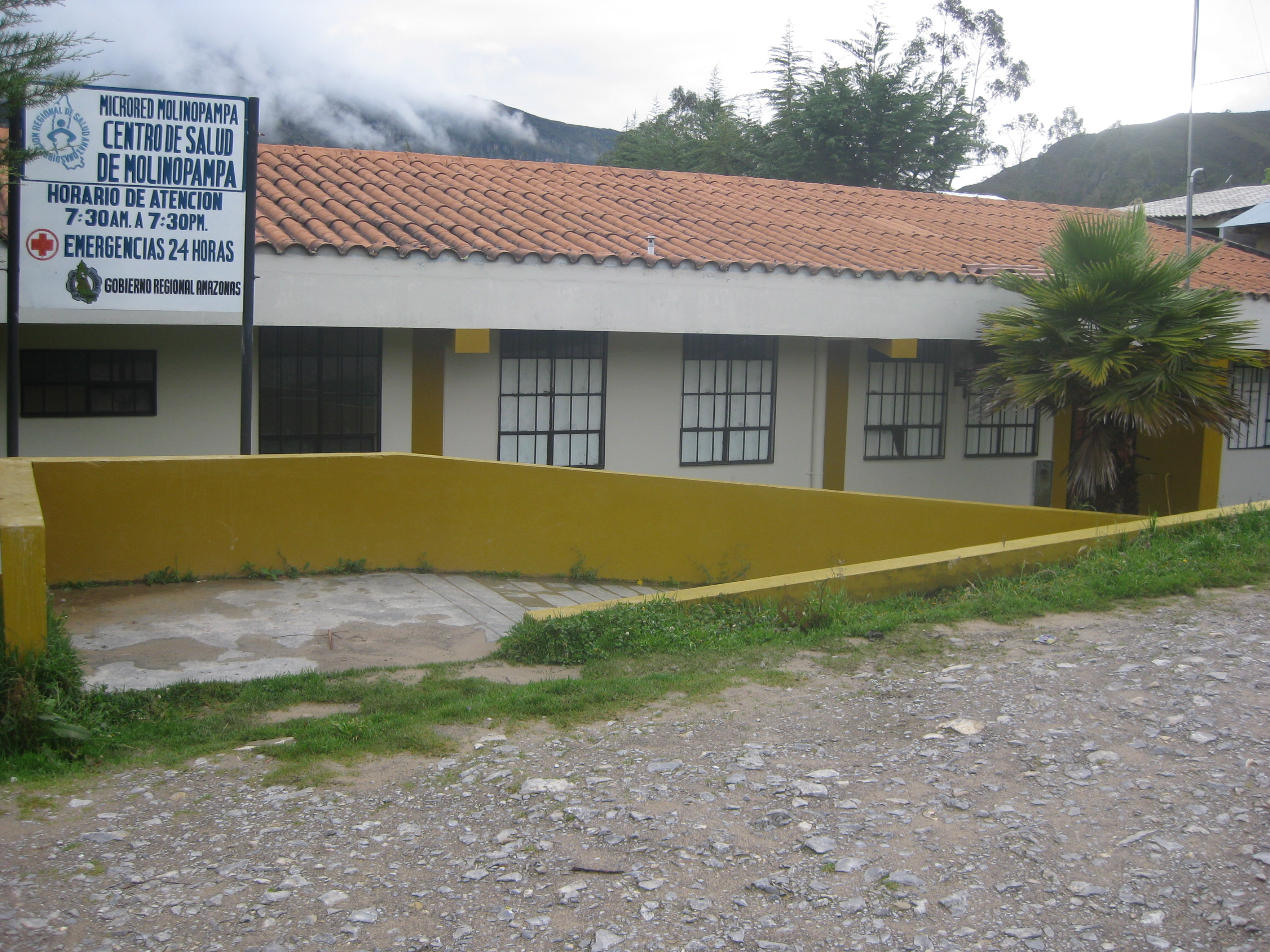
Health center of Molinopampa

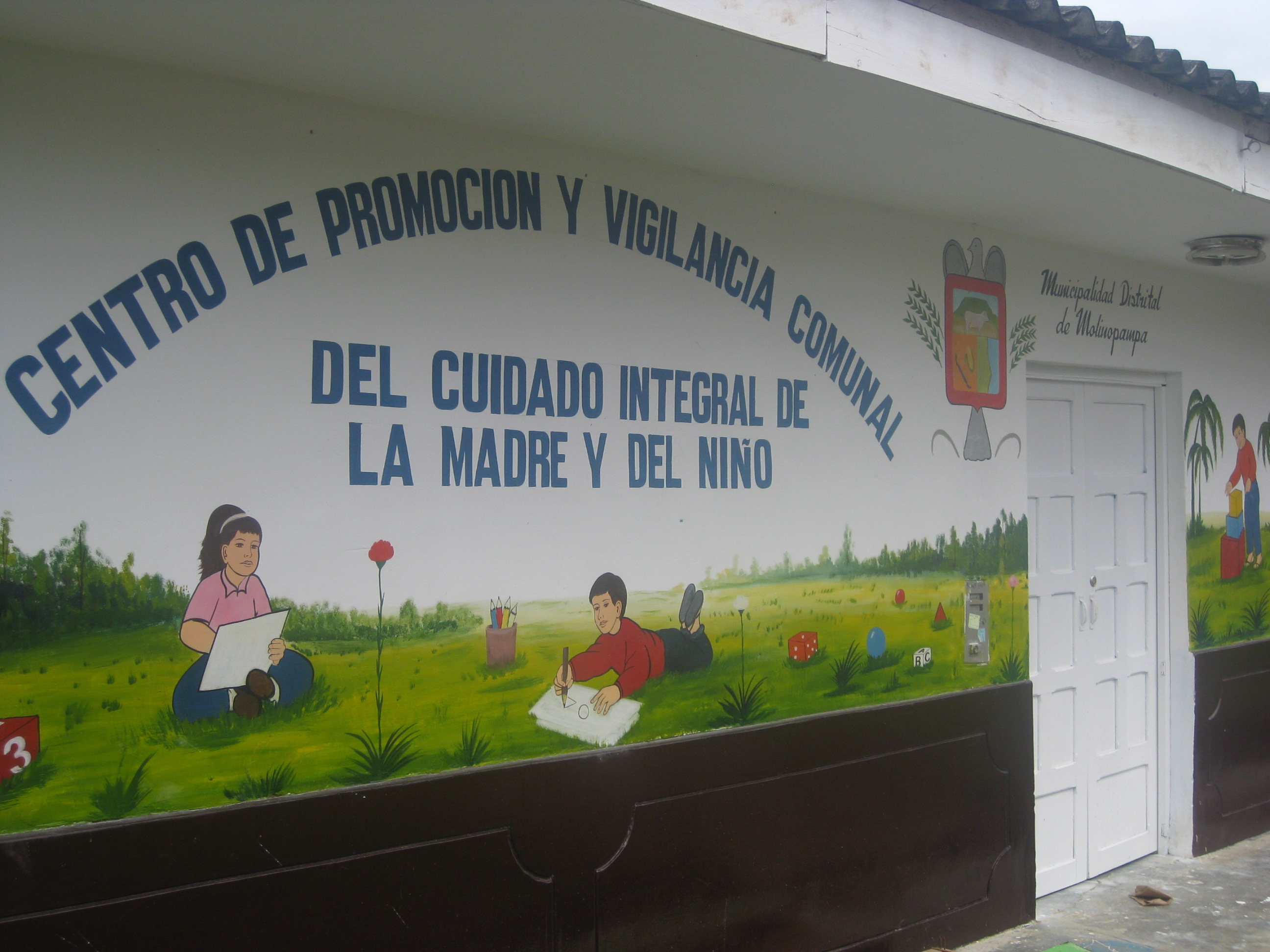
Centro de Promocion y Vigilancia Comunal del Cuidado Integral de la Madre y del Nino
