= Huancas District =

Coordinates: 6°10′26″S 77°51′53″W

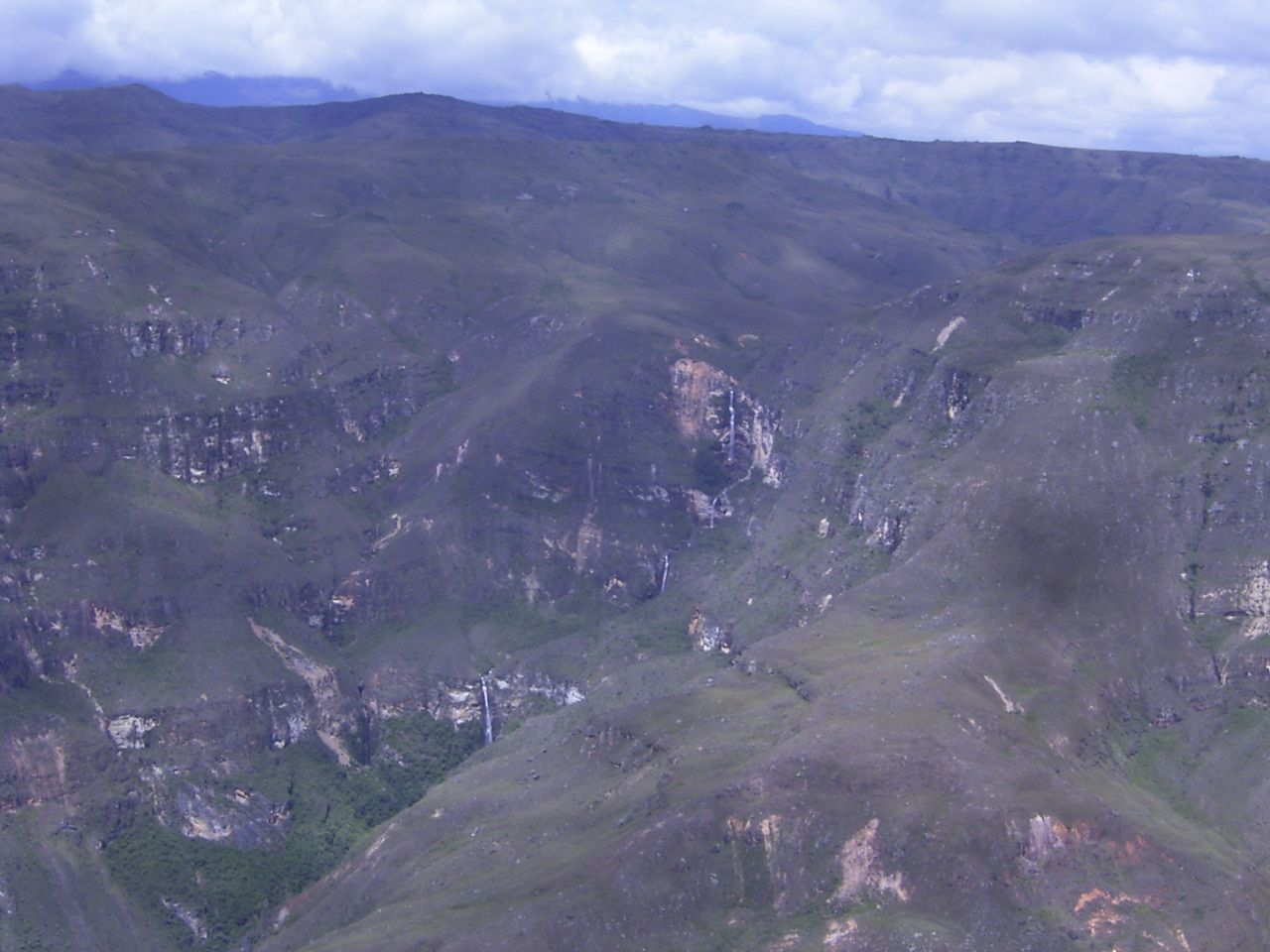
Beautiful waterfalls from one of the many viewpoints in Huancas.

Huancas is one of the 21 districts of Chachapoyas Province in the Amazonas Region of northern Peru. It is bounded to the north by Valera District, to the east by Sonche District, to the south by Chachapoyas District, and to the west by Luya District and Lámud District.

== History ==
The district was legally created on 5 February 1861, during the government of President Ramon Castilla.

== Geography ==
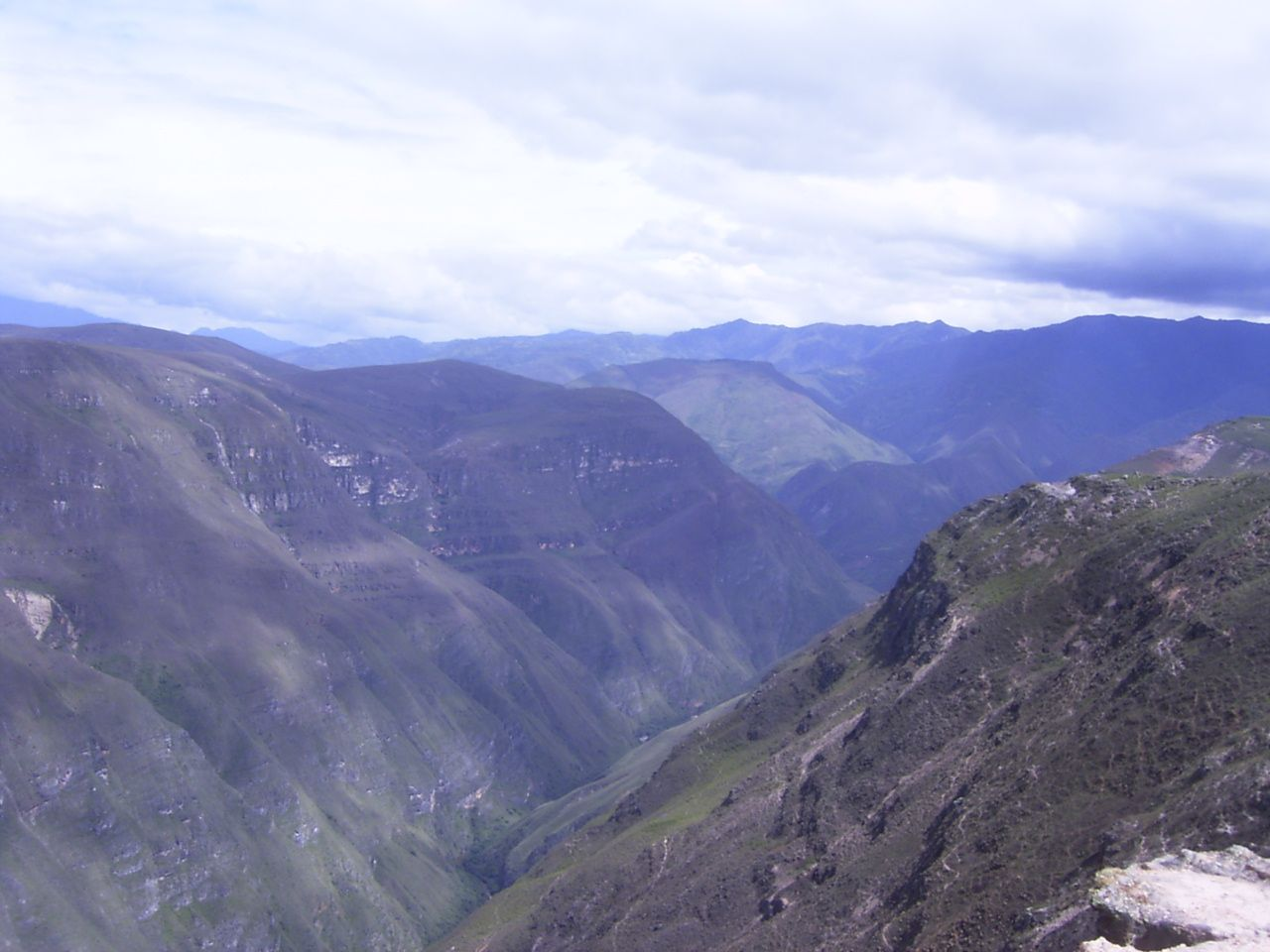
Sonche River near Huancas

Huancas District covers an area of 49 km^{2} and has a population of 1,305.

The capital is the town of Huancas, which is a 15-minute drive from the city of Chachapoyas. Huancas is located at a height of 2,558 m (8,392 ft) above sea level, in an area where high Amazon rainforest drops to the Sonche River, 962 m (3,156 ft) below. There is an attractive Colonial church located on the main square; and the citizens are well known for their earthenware (alfareria) – including clay cooking pots and jugs (cantaros) – that are hand-decorated and fired using open, wood-burning ovens

However, the most notable tourist draw is the stunning viewpoint over the Sonche Canyon, 1 km (0.6 miles) east of Huancas. Additionally, 3 km (1.9 miles) north of Huancas, is Huanca Urco hill, with views of where the Sonche, Vitaya and Utcubamba Rivers meet. On a clear day, the top part of Gocta Falls can be seen.

Huancas belongs to the parish of Chachapoyas, and is served by two priests from the Roman Catholic Diocese of Chachapoyas.

=== Towns and villages of Huancas district ===
- Huancas
- Yunga
- La Hoya
- Pacchapampa
- La Pitaya
- Cacapunta
- Maray Pampa

== Authorities ==
=== Municipal ===
- 2015 – 2018
  - Mayoress: Deysi Solano Cotrina, del Movimiento Regional Fuerza Amazonense
  - Councillors:
  1. Walter Manuel Isla Inga (Movimiento Regional Fuerza Amazonense)
  2. Edith Melendez Huamán (Movimiento Regional Fuerza Amazonense)
  3. María Noelia Puscan Inga (Movimiento Regional Fuerza Amazonense)
  4. Leandro Flores Quistan (Movimiento Regional Fuerza Amazonense)
  5. María Yolanda Vílchez Sánchez (Movimiento Independiente Surge Amazonas)

== Festivals ==
Huancas' patron saint is the Lord of the Miracles, so its annual festival is held on 18 October.

== See also ==
- Administrative divisions of Peru
- Peruvian Amazon
