= Granada, Peru =

Capital of Granada District in Amazonas, Peru

Coordinates: 6°06′S 77°38′W

- Granada District

Area
  - Total: 181.41 km^{2} (70.04 sq mi)
- Elevation: 3,013 m (9,885 ft)

Population (2020)
  - Total: 539

Granada, Peru is the capital of Granada District in Peru. It is located in the Chachapoyas Province.

Granada is a small mountain district in northern Peru, in the Chachapoyas Province of the Amazonas Region. It’s a quiet rural place with few people, located high in the Andes at about 3,000 meters above sea level. The weather is cool, and the area is surrounded by nature. Locals celebrate festivals in June with music, dancing, and traditional food. Granada is not a tourist spot, but it’s close to Kuélap, a famous ancient site. It’s a peaceful place for people who enjoy mountains and simple life.
