= Purunllacta (Cheto) =

Archaeological site in Peru

- Location within Peru
- 6°17′6.4″S 77°42′46.6″W
- Location: Peru
- Region: Amazonas Region, Chachapoyas Province, Cheto District

Purunllacta or Purum Llacta (Quechua purum, purun savage, wild / wasteland, llaqta place (village, town, city, country, nation) is an archaeological site of the Chachapoya culture in Peru. It is situated in the Amazonas Region, Chachapoyas Province, Cheto District, on the mountain of the same name. It lies northeast and near the archaeological site of Purunllacta of the Soloco District.

The site was declared a National Cultural Heritage by Resolución Directoral Nacional No. 196-INC on April 2, 2003.

== See also ==
- Machu Pirqa
- Quchapampa
