= Asunción District, Chachapoyas =

Coordinates: 6°00′00″S 77°40′37″W

Asunción
- District
- Interactive map of Asunción
- Country: Peru
- Region: Amazonas
- Province: Chachapoyas
- Founded: November 3, 1933
- Capital: Asunción

Government
  - Mayor: Helda Molinari Trauco

Area
  - Total: 25.71 km^{2} (9.93 sq mi)
- Elevation: 2,820 m (9,250 ft)

Population (2005 census)
  - Total: 353
  - Density: 13.7/km^{2} (35.6/sq mi)
- Time zone: UTC-5 (PET)
- UBIGEO: 010102

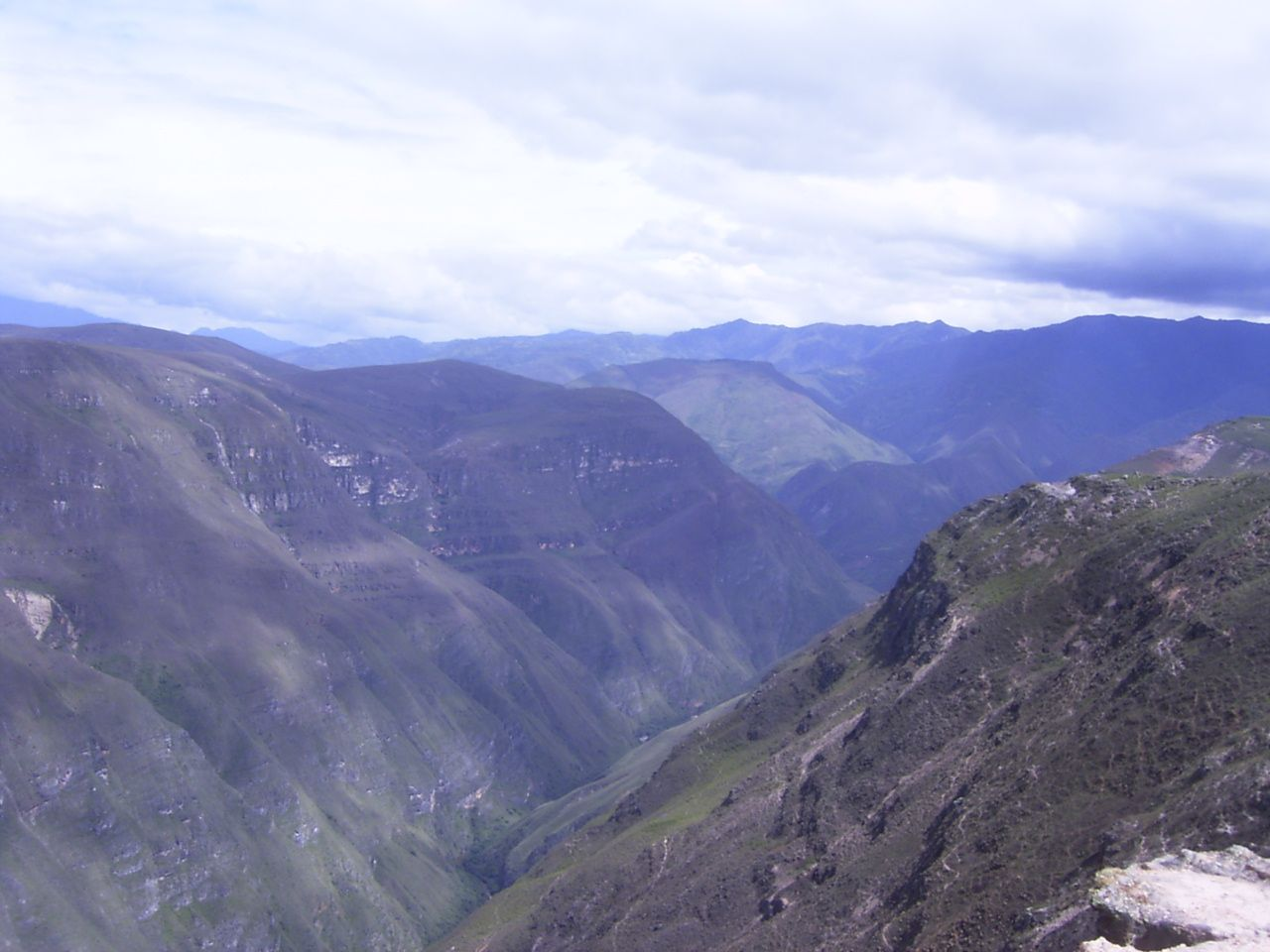
The Sonche River in Asunción

Asunción is a district of the Chachapoyas Province, Peru. The District of Asunción is located in the northern part of the province in Amazonas Region; the capital is the town of Goncha.

The district covers an area of 25.71 km²; the elevation of the district capital is 2,820 above sea level. The climate is moderate to dry moderate cold.

The District of Asunción borders:

- For the North: With the Bongará Province
- For the South: With the Quinjalca District
- For the East: With the Olleros District
- For the West: With the Chiliquín District
