= Chachapoyas province =

Coordinates: 6°20′S 77°48′W

Chachapoyas
- Province
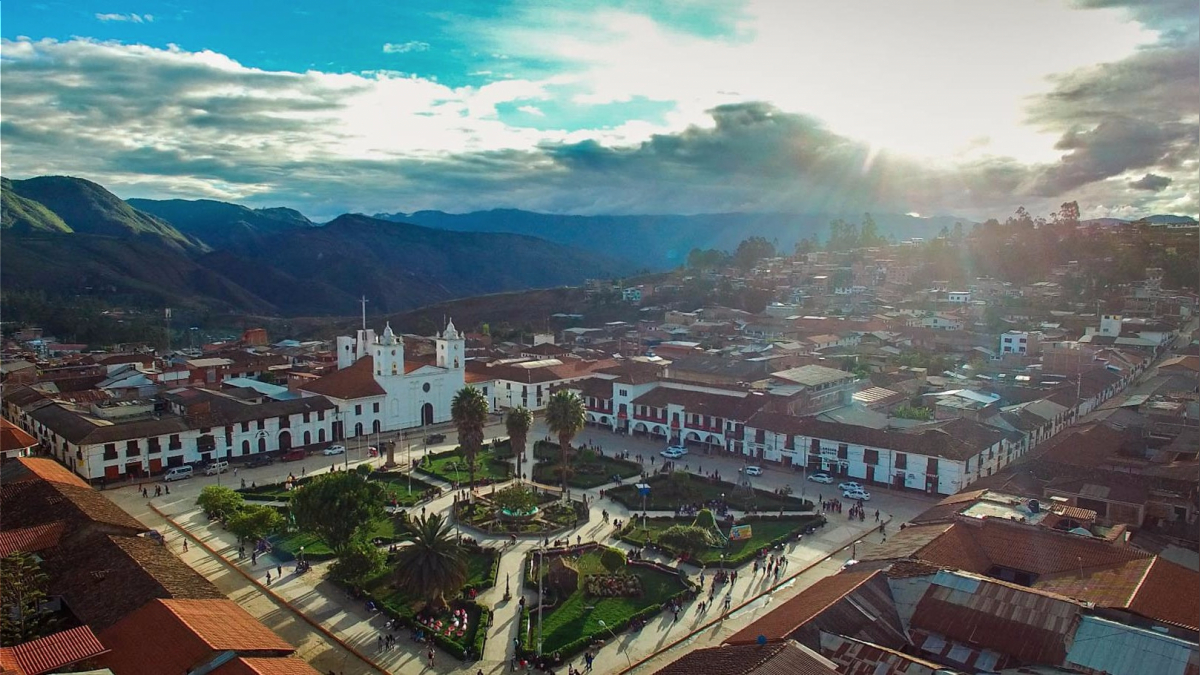
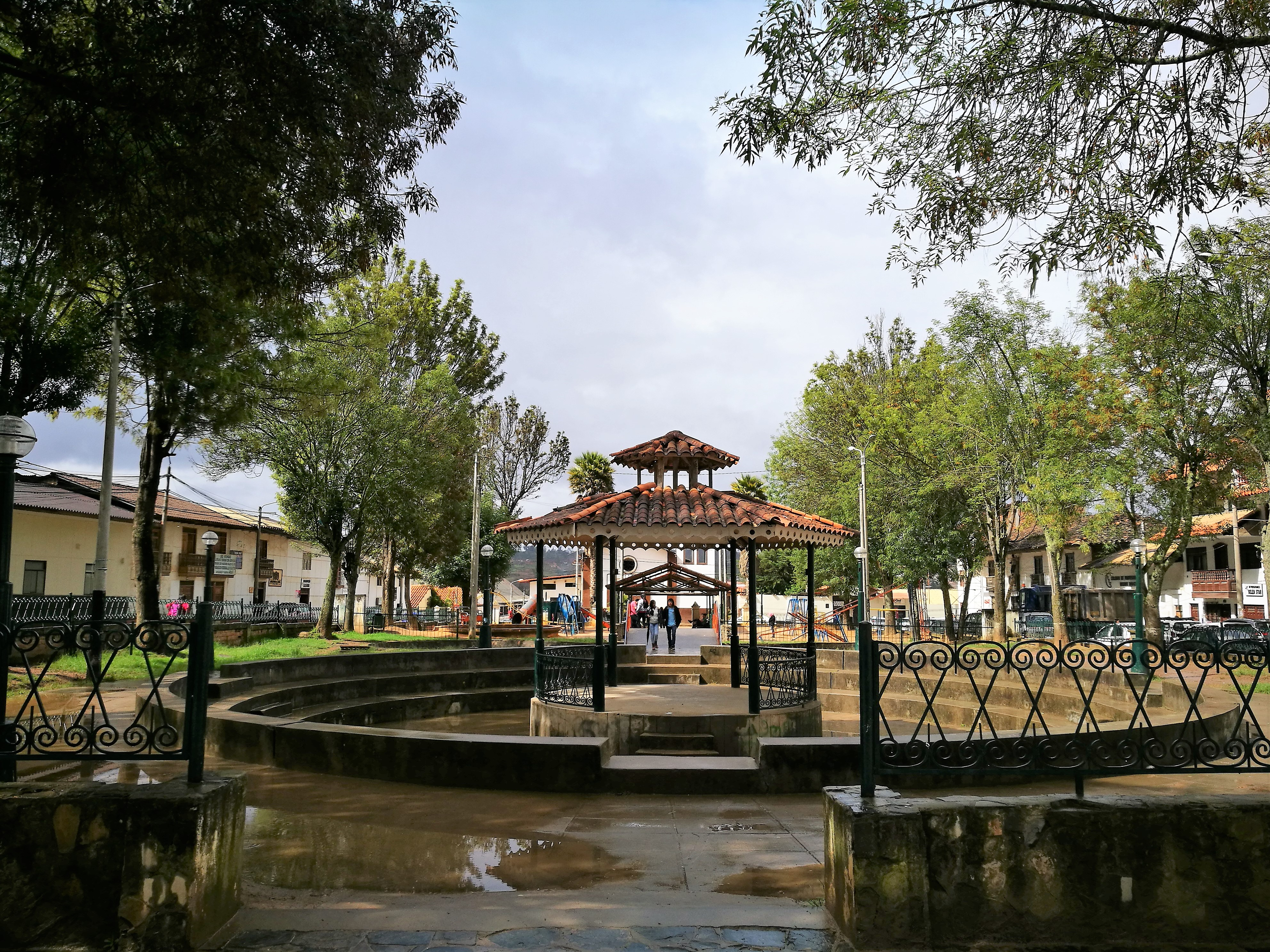
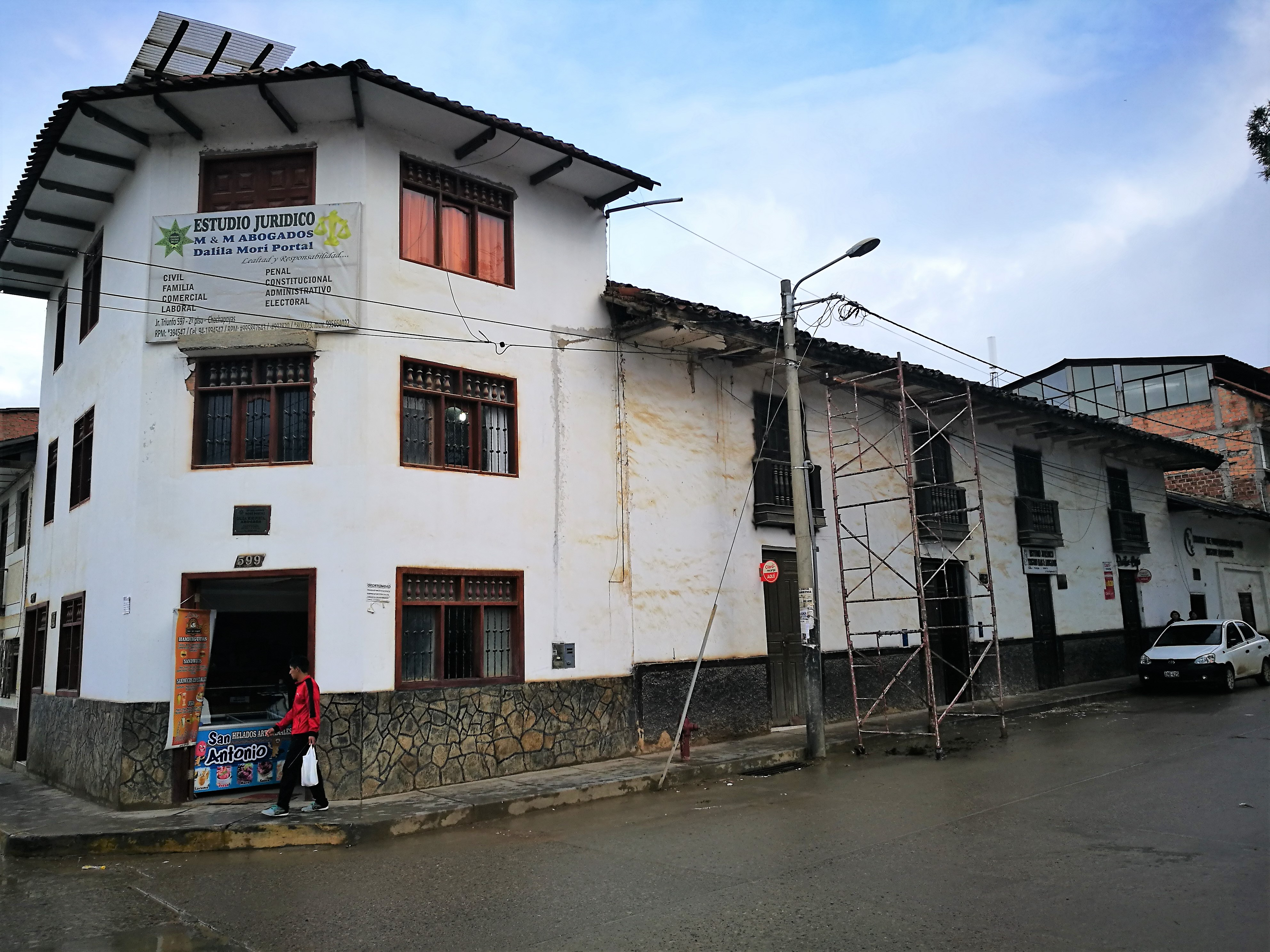
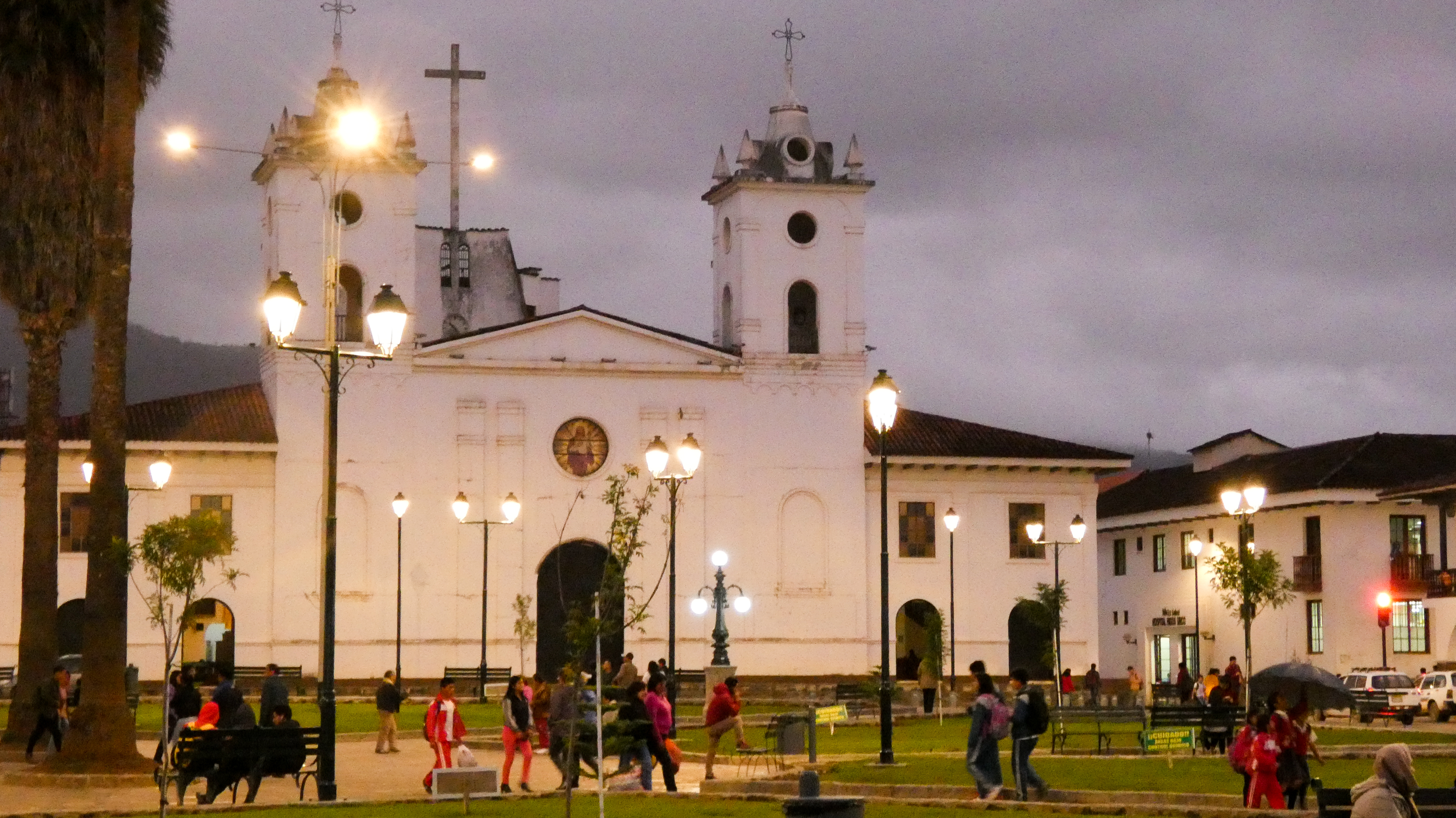
- Chachapoyas, Peru Chachapoyas Cathedral Aerial View of a City in Chachapoyas

- Flag Coat of arms

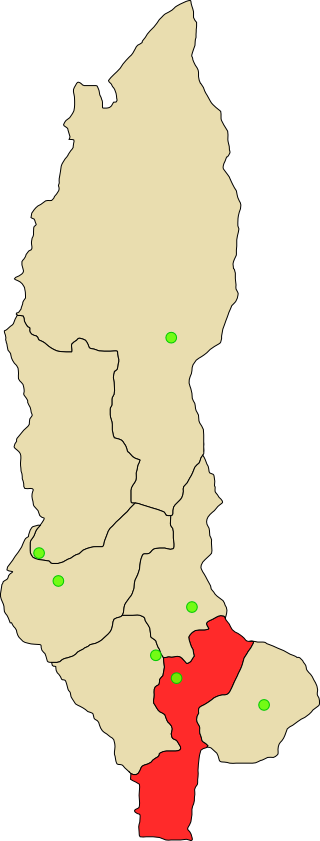
- Location of Chachapoyas in the Amazonas Region

- Location of Amazonas Province in Perú
- Country: Peru
- Region: Amazonas
- Founded: November 21, 1832
- Capital: Chachapoyas

Government
  - Mayor: Víctor Raúl Culqui Puerta (2019-2022)

Area
  - Total: 3,312.37 km^{2} (1,278.91 sq mi)
- Elevation: 2,335 m (7,661 ft)

Population
  - Total: 49,573
  - Density: 14.966/km^{2} (38.762/sq mi)
- UBIGEO: 0101
- Website: www.gob.pe/munichachapoyas

Chachapoyas is a province of the Amazonas Region, Peru. The province of Chachapoyas was a part of the department of Trujillo (according to the supreme decree of February 12, 1821) being its capital the city of Chachapoyas.

After the department of Amazonas was created, by law of November 21, 1832, it became a province of the Amazonas region, and the city of Chachapoyas remained a regional capital. Its principal quarters are:

- To the north: Luya Urco and Santo Domingo
- To the south: Yanco and La Laguna.

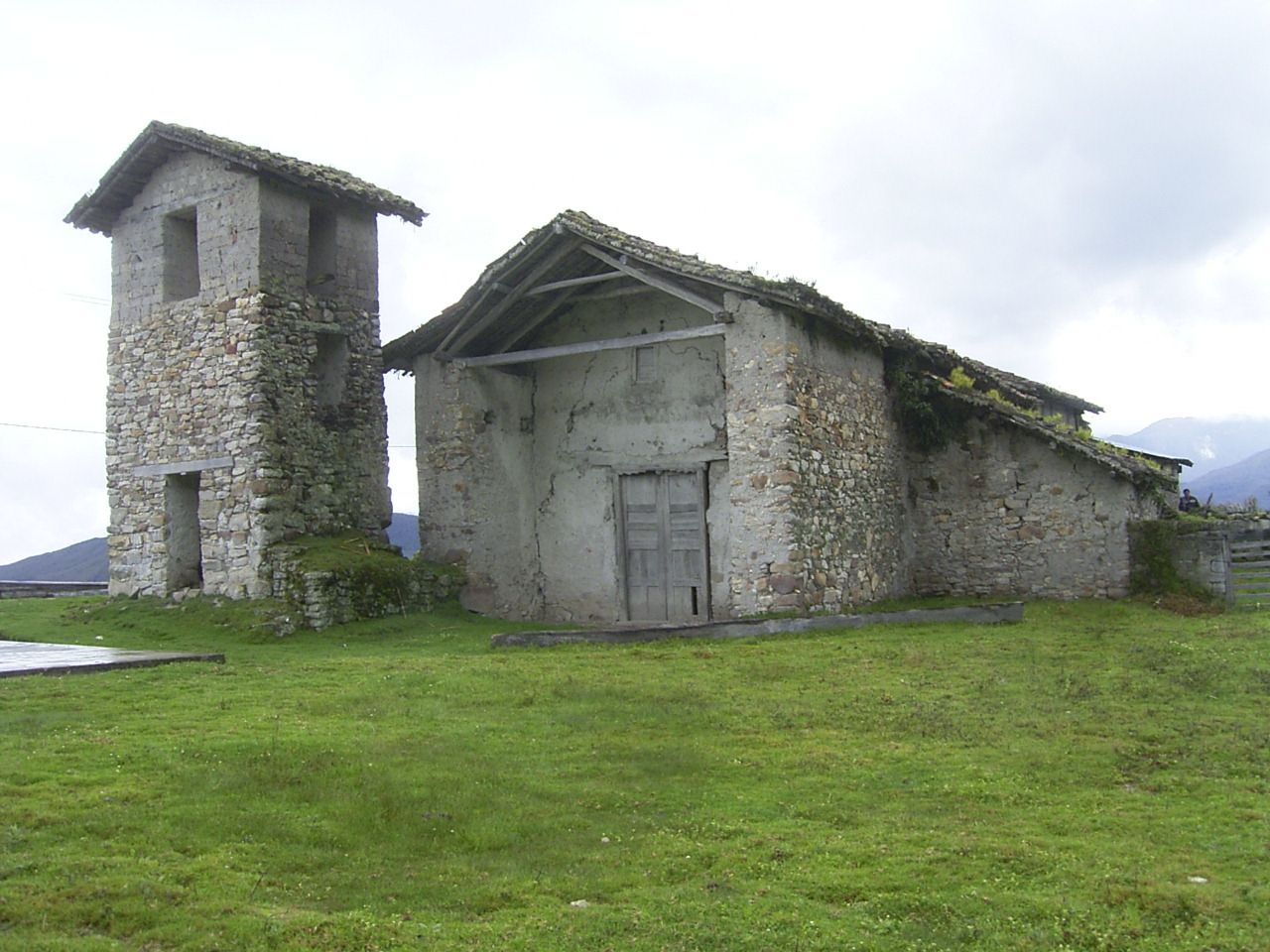
The church of Chiliquín, Amazonas.

A big part of the province is constituted by soils of puna, located between 4,000 and 5,000 metres (13,000 and 16,000 ft) in the oriental districts of Chiliquín, Quinjalca and Granada.

Two principal rivers cover its territory: the Utcubamba, which runs from south to north and which right margin is dedicated to the agriculture in diverse form; and the Sonche, which runs from east to west and it is born from the meeting of several creeks that go down the heights of Molino Pampa district. This river flows into the Utcubamba along with the Huancachaca. It has a short trip, its beaches are narrow and its areas are unusable because its slopes are rocky and steep.

In Shihual, a Magdalena's district, there are many calcareous caverns, which stalactites and stalagmites formations serve as habitat to diverse night birds.

La Jalca has the privilege of being the first Spanish city that has been founded in the region: in effect, captain Alonso de Alvarado, conqueror of the Amazonas, on September 5, 1538 founded there the first city of San Juan de la Frontera de los Chachapoyas, which then would be moved to the place that it occupies now.

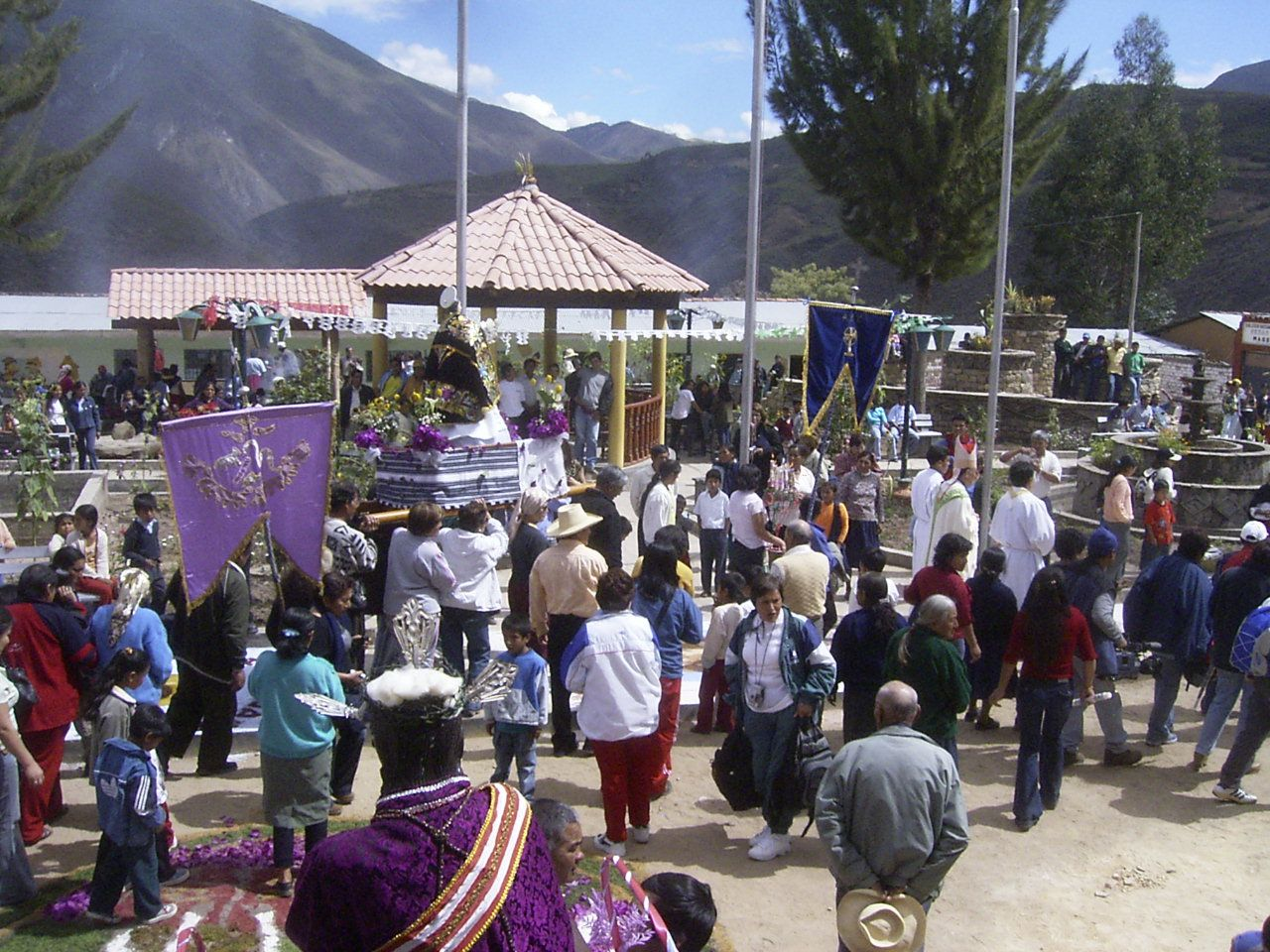
The town of Magdalena celebrating its festivities.

For Peter Lerche, an anthropologist, in la Jalca there is the legitimate Andean pre-Hispanic indigenous Peruvian culture, with traditional towns like Conila, Levanto, Colcamar, Luya. Fruit of his investigations initiated in 1980, he has published "Chachapoyas, travelers' guide". In this book he proposes some tourist circuits. The first one of them, the shortest, can take in average 5 days, and the others, for more adventurous spirits, can take in average 15 days.

Historically, the Chachapoya were in conflict with the Inca and also the Spanish colonisers.

== Political division ==
Chachapoyas is divided into twenty-one districts, which are:

District	Mayor
Asunción	Helda Molinari Trauco
Balsas	Eugenio Eslivan Tirado Ortiz
Chachapoyas	Víctor Raúl Culqui Puerta
Cheto	Elita Culquimboz Huaman
Chiliquín	Lazaro Quiroz Chuqui
Chuquibamba	Celso Leuman Portal Bustamante
Granada	Enoc Pilco Valle
Huancas	Asuncion Inga Cruz
La Jalca	Jose Tulio Culqui Velasquez
Leimebamba	Engels Escobedo Portal
Levanto	Rodolfo Inga Huaman
Magdalena	Diogenes Humberto Zavaleta Tenorio
Mariscal Castilla	Pedro Tuesta Culqui
Molinopampa	Zonia Maria Negron Tafur
Montevideo	Adalberto Rojas Gutierrez
Olleros	Nilcer Vargas Lapiz
Quinjalca	Braulio Baldemar Goñas Culqui
San Francisco de Daguas	Nelson Ernesto Lopez Portocarrero
San Isidro de Maino	Jose Anibal Santillan Vasquez
Soloco	Cenovio Loja Culqui
Sonche	Segundo Miguel Garcia Alvarado

== See also ==
- Administrative divisions of Peru
- Machu Pirqa
- Purum Llaqta, Cheto
- Purum Llaqta, Soloco
- Quchapampa
