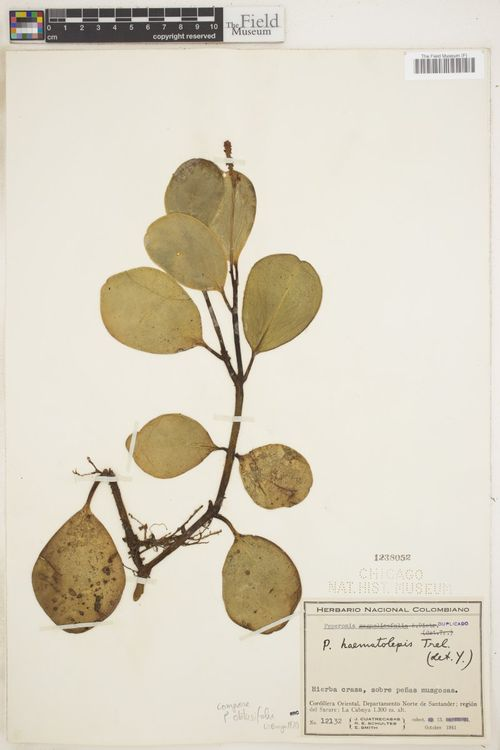

Scientific classification
- Kingdom: Plantae
- Clade: Tracheophytes
- Clade: Angiosperms
- Clade: Magnoliids
- Order: Piperales
- Family: Piperaceae
- Genus: Peperomia
- Species: P. haematolepis

Binomial name
- Peperomia haematolepis Trel.

= Peperomia haematolepis =

Species of epiphyte

Peperomia haematolepis is a species of epiphyte in the genus Peperomia that is endemic to Peru. It grows on wet tropical biomes. Its conservation status is Not Threatened.

== Description ==
The type specimen were collected near Balsas, Peru.

Peperomia haematolepis is a rather large, succulent, glabrous herb. The stem is 3–5 mm thick and exfoliates in a scurfy manner. The alternate leaves are orbicular to round-subobovate, slightly emarginate, with a rounded to somewhat acute base, measuring 4.5 cm long and 3–4 cm wide. They have few pinnate nerves, are leathery, and opaque. The petiole is 5–10 mm long. The terminal spikes, when young, are 15–20 mm long and 3 mm thick, borne on a peduncle 2–2.5 cm long. The round-peltate bracts are a distinctive red-orange color.

== Taxonomy and naming ==
It was described in 1936 by William Trelease in Publications of the Field Museum of Natural History, Botanical Series 13, from specimens collected by Frank Lincoln Stevens. The epithet haematolepis is derived from the Greek haima and lepis, referring to the striking red-orange color of the floral bracts.

== Distribution and habitat ==
It is endemic to Peru. It grows on an epiphyte environment and is a herb. It grows on wet tropical biomes.

== Conservation ==
This species is assessed as Not Threatened, in a preliminary report.
