= Levanto =

Levanto may refer to the following places:

- Levanto, Liguria, a comune in the Province of La Spezia, Italy
- Levanto District, a district in the Province of Chachapoyas, Amazonas, Peru
