= Higos Urco pampa =

Coordinates: 6.2287°S 77.8541°W

Higos Urco pampa is a historical place in Chachapoyas, Peru where the battle of the same name was fought on 6 June 1821, before José de San Martín proclaimed Peruvian independence.

In remembrance and commemoration of the battle, there is a small square raised.
