= La Jalca District =

Coordinates: 6°28′59″S 77°43′01″W

La Jalca
- District
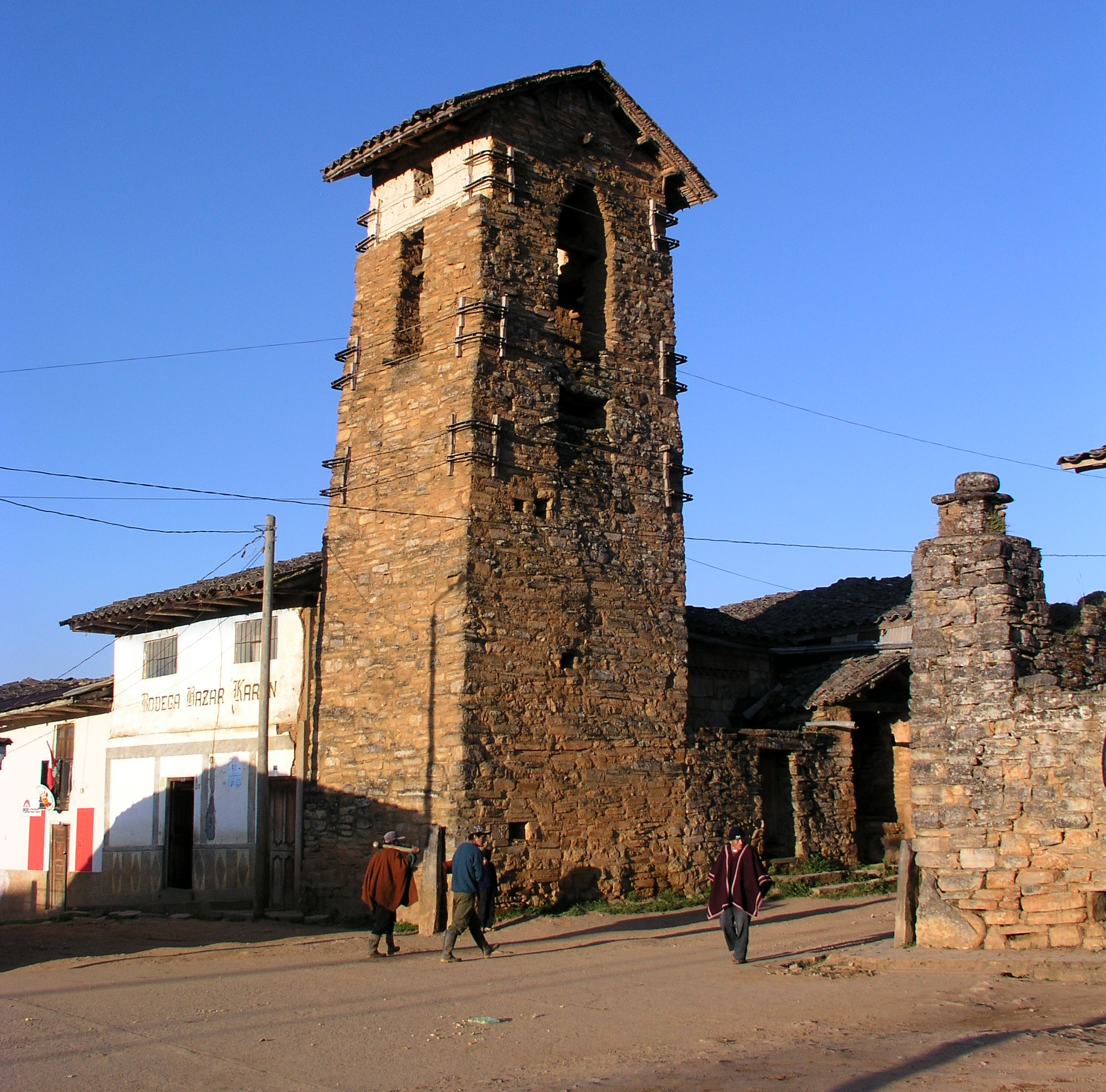
- La Jalca District
- Interactive map of La Jalca
- Country: Peru
- Region: Amazonas
- Province: Chachapoyas
- Capital: La Jalca

Government
  - Mayor: José Gilmer Puscan Huaman

Area
  - Total: 380.39 km^{2} (146.87 sq mi)
- Elevation: 2,800 m (9,200 ft)

Population (2005 census)
  - Total: 5,245
  - Density: 13.79/km^{2} (35.71/sq mi)
- Time zone: UTC-5 (PET)
- UBIGEO: 010109

La Jalca is a district of the Chachapoyas Province in the Amazonas Region, Peru. Its capital is La Jalca, also known as Jalca, Jalca Grande or La Jalca Grande. It was the first Spanish foundation of the region. The current city of Chachapoyas was established here. Founded in 1538 as San Juan de la Frontera de los Chachapoyas ("Saint John of the Frontier of the Chachapoyas") Chachapoyas was later moved to its present location.

The famous juanes, a typical plate of the forest, prepared and invented for the festivity, also date back to this epoch. In contrast to the current juanes iquiteños they were prepared by means of yuca.
