= Olleros District, Chachapoyas =

Coordinates: 6°00′00″S 77°37′01″W

Olleros District Distrito de Olleros
- District
- Interactive map of Olleros District
- Country: Peru
- Region: Amazonas
- Province: Chachapoyas
- Capital: Olleros

Government
  - Mayor: Nilcer Vargas Lapiz

Area
  - Total: 125.16 km^{2} (48.32 sq mi)
- Elevation: 3,050 m (10,010 ft)

Population (2005 census)
  - Total: 460
  - Density: 3.7/km^{2} (9.5/sq mi)
- Time zone: UTC-5 (PET)
- UBIGEO: 010116

Olleros District is one of twenty-one districts of the province Chachapoyas in Peru.
