= Shihual (Peru) =

Coordinates: 6.3720°S 77.8818°W

Shihual cave is located to the north of La Jalca, Peru, and has several caverns. In the interior of these, numerous stalactites and stalagmites have formed that serve as refuge to the different species of night birds of the region.
