= Chuquibamba District, Chachapoyas =

Coordinates: 7°00′S 77°51′W

Chuquibamba Chuqipampa
- District
- Interactive map of Chuquibamba
- Country: Peru
- Region: Amazonas
- Province: Chachapoyas
- Capital: Chuquibamba

Government
  - Mayor: Celso Leuman Portal Bustamante

Area
  - Total: 278.63 km^{2} (107.58 sq mi)
- Elevation: 2,825 m (9,268 ft)

Population (2005 census)
  - Total: 1,983
  - Density: 7.117/km^{2} (18.43/sq mi)
- Time zone: UTC-5 (PET)
- UBIGEO: 010106

Chuquibamba District is one of twenty-one districts of the province Chachapoyas in Peru.

== See also ==
- Quchapampa
