= Pedro de Añazco =

Peruvian creole Jesuit missionary

Pedro de Añazco was a Peruvian creole Jesuit missionary.

== Biography ==
He was born at Chachapoyas (Peru) in 1550 and died at Asunción (Paraguay) in 1605. His father Pedro de Añazco was a Spanish captain, and companion of Sebastián de Belalcázar in the conquest of Ecuador. Through him, it is said, the first notice of the "Dorado" of Guatavitá reached the Spaniards in Ecuador.No es posible que el conquistador Pedro de Añasco fuera padre del Jesuíta, pues murió en 1540, diez años antes que naciera el misionero.

At the age of twenty-two, Añazco became a Jesuit. In 1577, he was sent to Julí, on Lake Titicaca. Thence he passed to the Chaco tribe among the Abipón people and in 1593 to Paraguay, where he died.

== Works ==
In addition to his missionary work, Añazco was a student of Indian languages. Gonzalez Dávila and Lozano credit him with having composed grammars, "doctrines" and catechisms in nine different Indian languages of South America.

None of Añazco's linguistic works have been published, and most of his manuscripts are likely lost.

== Sources ==
- The entry cites:
- Dávila, teatro eclesiastico de la primitiva Iglesia de las Indias occidentales (Madrid, 1649)
- Lozano, Descripcion del gran Chaco (Cordova, 1733)
- Mendiburu, Diccionario
- Torres Saldamando, Antiguos Jesuitas (Lima, 1882)
- Relaciones geograficas de Indias (Madrid, 1897), Appendix IV,
