= San Francisco de Daguas District =

Coordinates: 6°37′01″S 77°46′01″W

San Francisco de Daguas
- District
- Interactive map of San Francisco de Daguas
- Country: Peru
- Region: Amazonas
- Province: Chachapoyas
- Founded: May 14, 1952
- Capital: Daguas

Government
  - Mayor: Ludmilia Culquimboz Ruiz

Area
  - Total: 47.41 km^{2} (18.31 sq mi)
- Elevation: 2,360 m (7,740 ft)

Population (2005 census)
  - Total: 309
  - Density: 6.52/km^{2} (16.9/sq mi)
- Time zone: UTC-5 (PET)
- UBIGEO: 010118

San Francisco de Daguas is a district of the province of Chachapoyas. The district of San Francisco de Daguas finds located in the province of Chachapoyas Departamento of the Amazon his soils they present an eventful topography. The capital Distrital is located to an altitude of 2,500 m.s.n.m.

According to the census carried out in the year 1993 and his projection. The district of San Francisco de Daguas has a population of 321 inhabitants for the year 2005 of, whom 52% are and 48% are women; most of the population is located in the urban area with 81%; and in rural area 19%.

The population of the district finds in most cases 49% between 0 and 24 years, 51% is from 25 to 44 and more, what it demonstrates a demand for services especially for generation of employment.
