= Montevideo District =

Coordinates: 6°37′59″S 77°43′01″W

Montevideo
- District
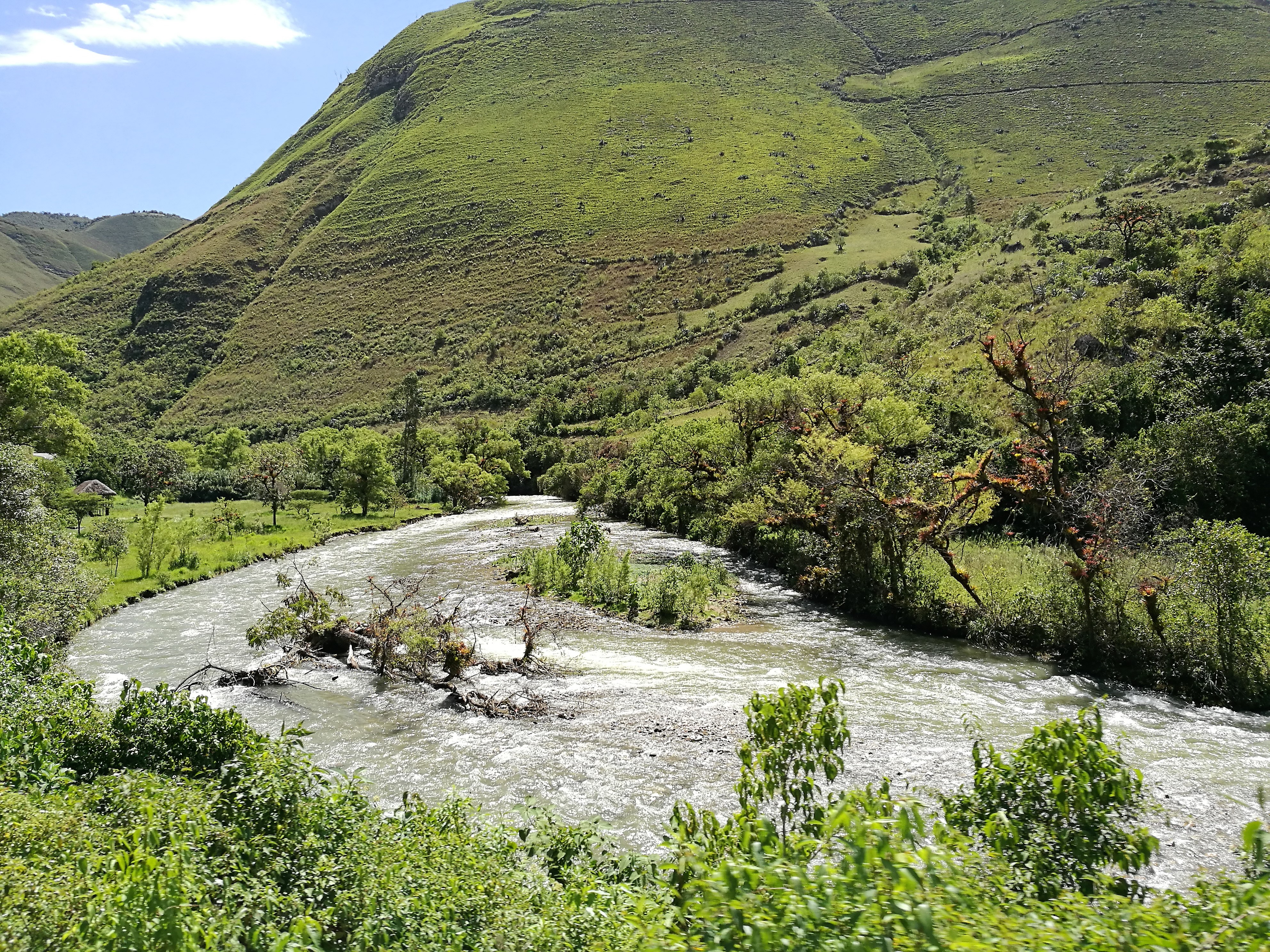
- Utcubamba River in the Montevideo District
- Interactive map of Montevideo
- Country: Peru
- Region: Amazonas
- Province: Chachapoyas
- Founded: November 3, 1933
- Capital: Montevideo

Government
  - Mayor: Delmer Manuel Vergaray Sánchez

Area
  - Total: 119.01 km^{2} (45.95 sq mi)
- Elevation: 2,450 m (8,040 ft)

Population (2017)
  - Total: 496
  - Density: 4.17/km^{2} (10.8/sq mi)
- Time zone: UTC-5 (PET)
- UBIGEO: 010115

Montevideo District is one of twenty-one districts of the province Chachapoyas in Peru.
