= Balsas District =

Coordinates: 6°49′59″S 78°01′01″W

Balsas
- District
- Interactive map of Balsas
- Country: Peru
- Region: Amazonas
- Province: Chachapoyas
- Capital: Balsas

Government
  - Mayor: Eugenio Eslivan Tirado Ortiz

Area
  - Total: 357.09 km^{2} (137.87 sq mi)
- Elevation: 854 m (2,802 ft)

Population (2005 census)
  - Total: 1,233
  - Density: 3.453/km^{2} (8.943/sq mi)
- Time zone: UTC-5 (PET)
- UBIGEO: 010103

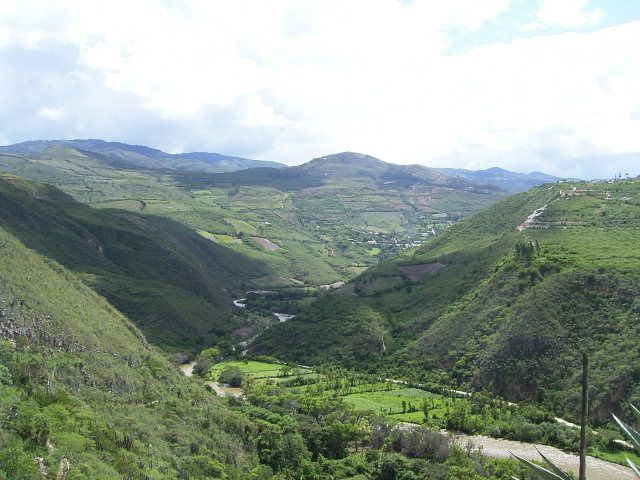
The Utcabamba river–valley

Balsas (Spanish for Rafts) is a district of the province of Chachapoyas, Peru. The District of Balsas was created in epoch of the independence, between 1821 and 1824.

The district capital is Balsas. The district covers an area of 357.09 km^{2}, and is located at an altitude of 854 above sea level.

Major festivals in the area are the carnivals in February, Guadalupe's Virgin on October 9, and Master of the Miracles on October 28.

His most out-standing tourist attractions are: the Vales of the River Cashew, archaeological ruins of Balsas, Gollón and Pircapunta, which are also declared as a cultural heritage of the nation.

The name was given because near there existed a wooden bridge made from rafts that the Inca Wayna Capac ordered to build for the advance of his troops in order to pacify the rebellious Chachapoya Kingdom.
