= La Jalca (Peru) =

Coordinates: 6°29′S 77°49′W

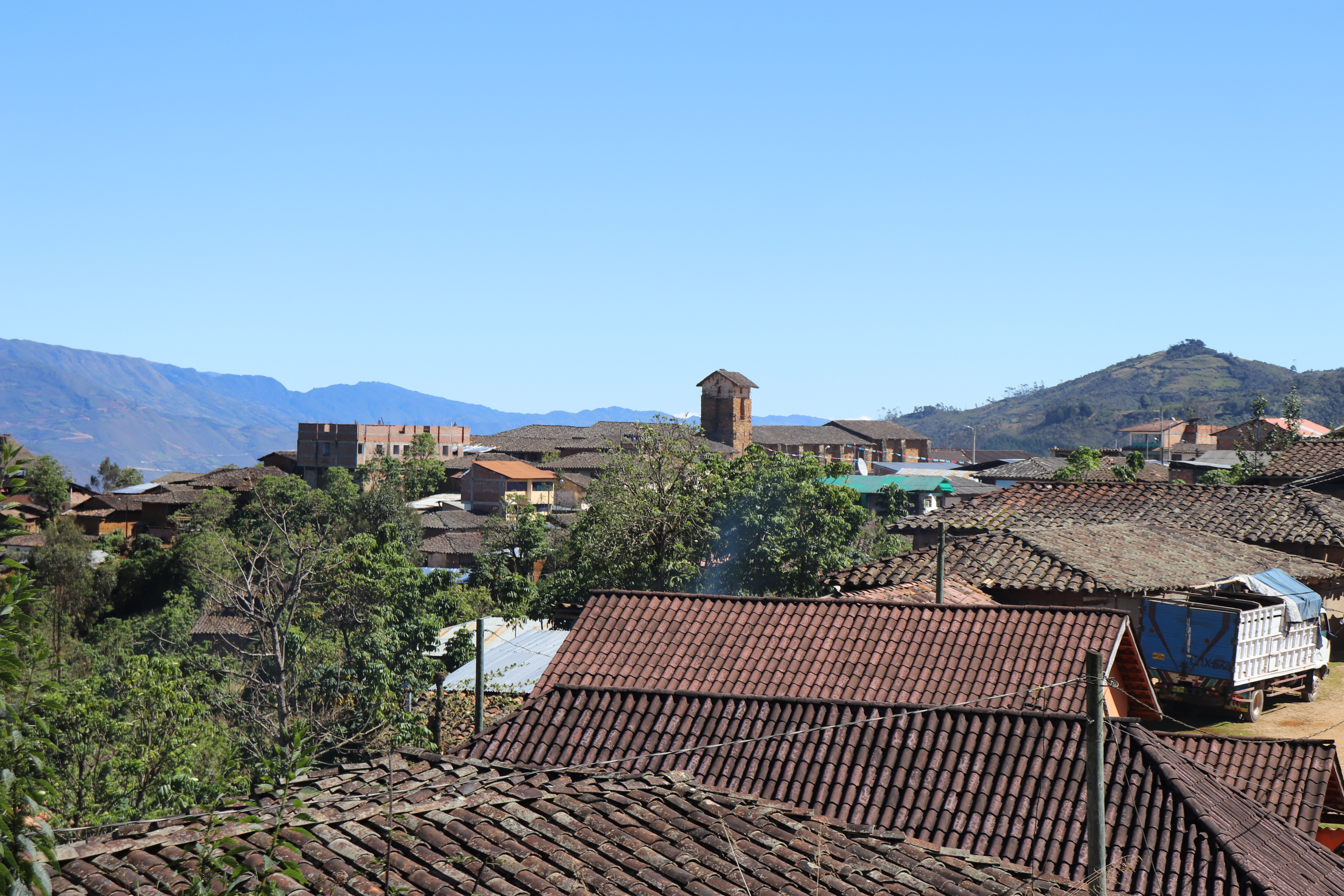
La Jalca town

La Jalca was the first Spanish foundation of the region in northern Peru. It was established as the first head office of the current city of Chachapoyas. There in 1538, he took the name of Saint John of the Border of the Chachapoyas, in honor to his holy boss. Also of this epoch they date the famous juanes, typical plate of the forest prepared and invented for the festivity and that, in contrast to the current juanes iquiteños were prepared with yucca.
