= Chachapoyas, Peru =

Chachapoyas
- City
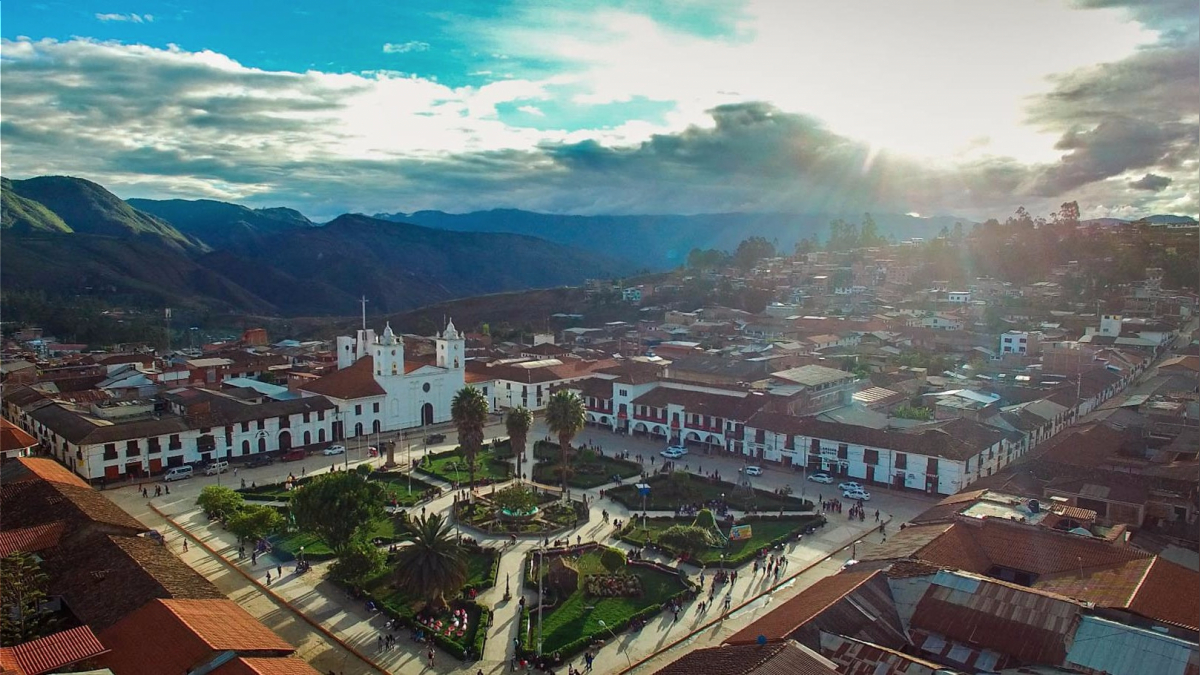
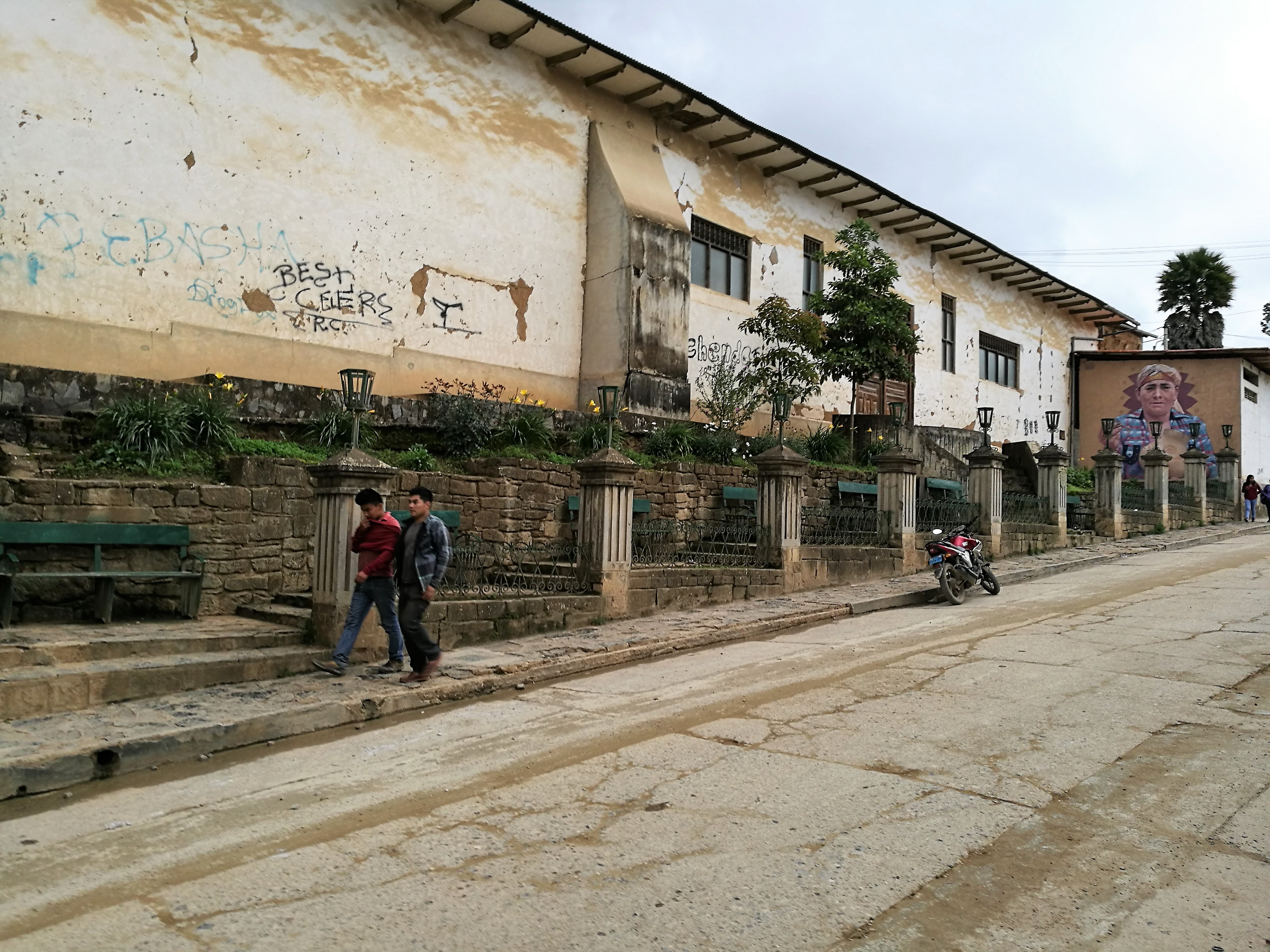
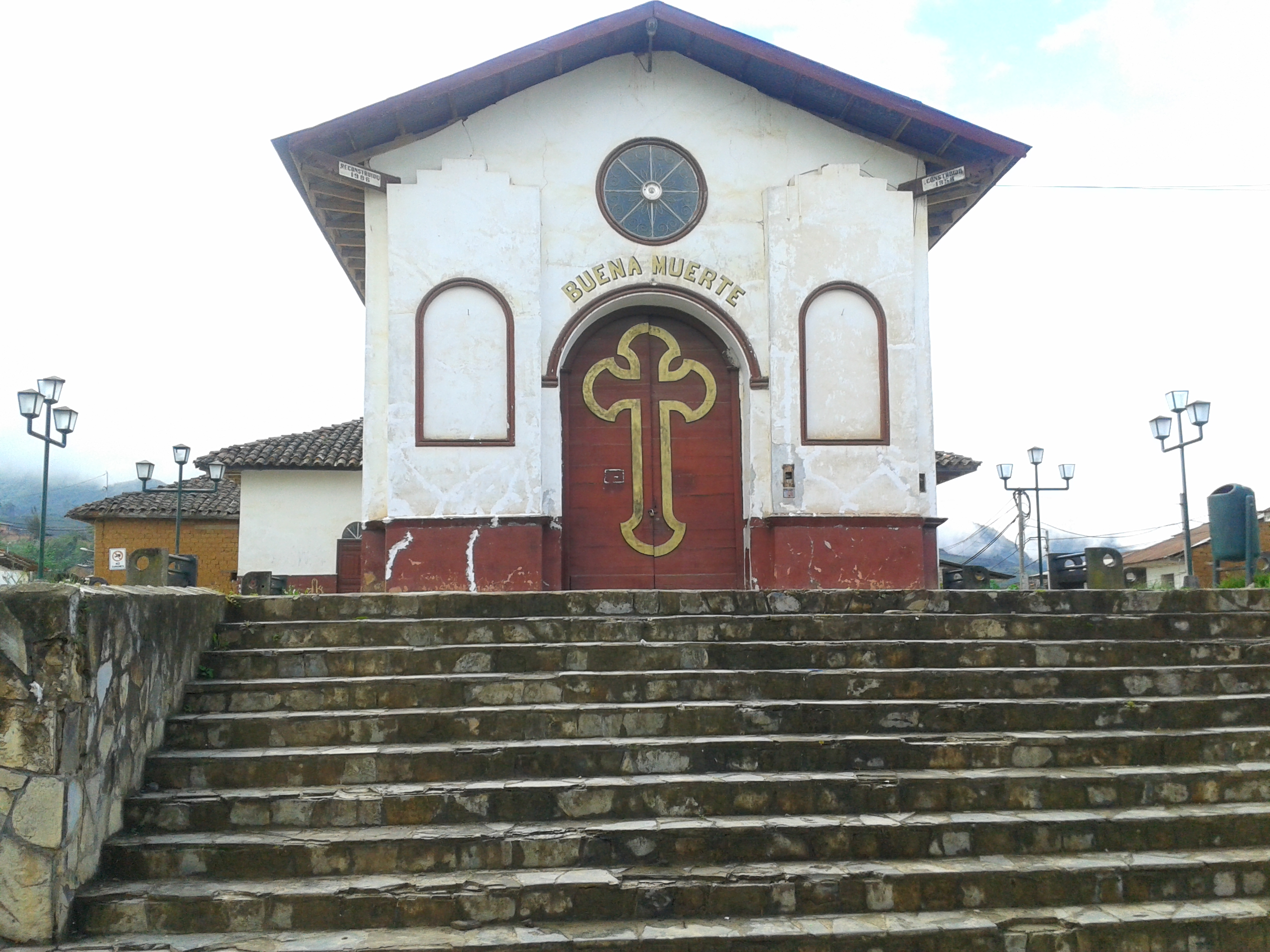
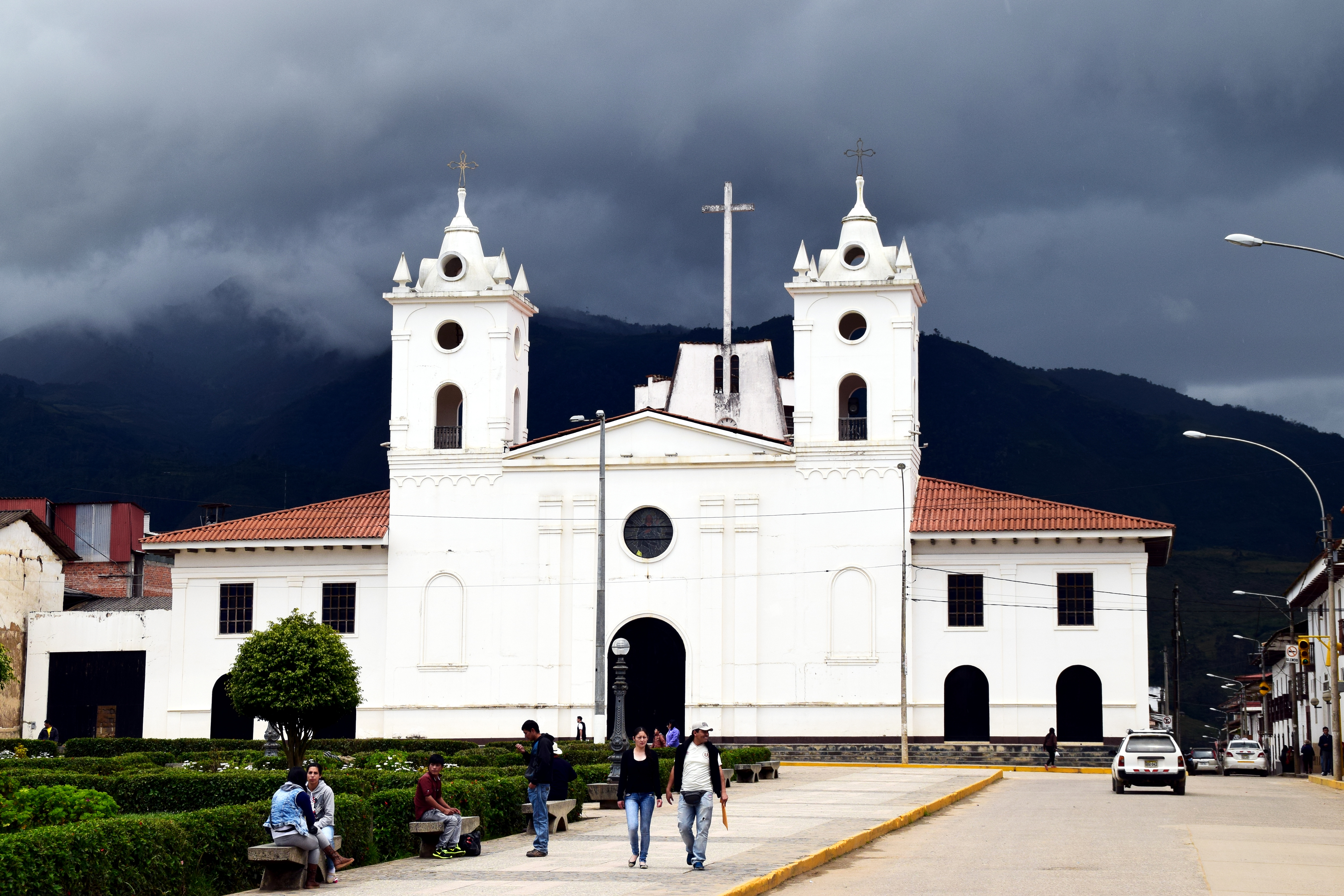
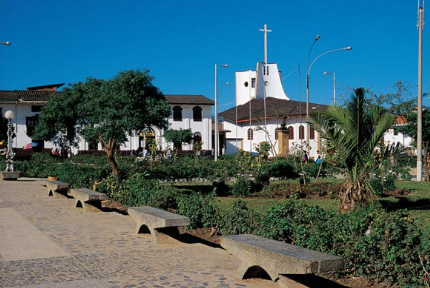
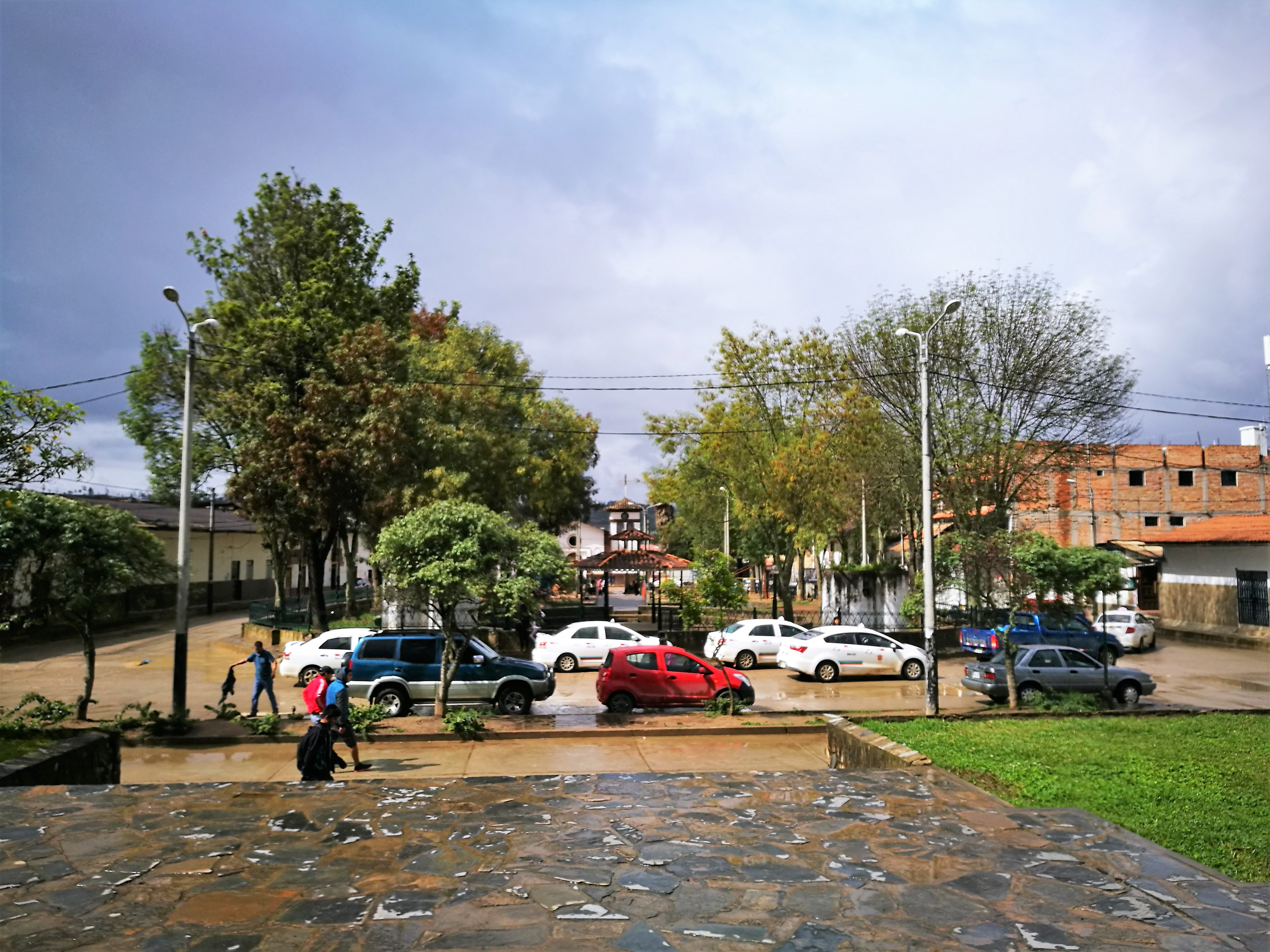
- Top: Cathedral of Chachapoyas, Second left: Tattered graffiti, Second right: Buena Muerte Church, Third left: Cathedral, Third right: Main Square, Bottom: Belen de Chachapoyas Park

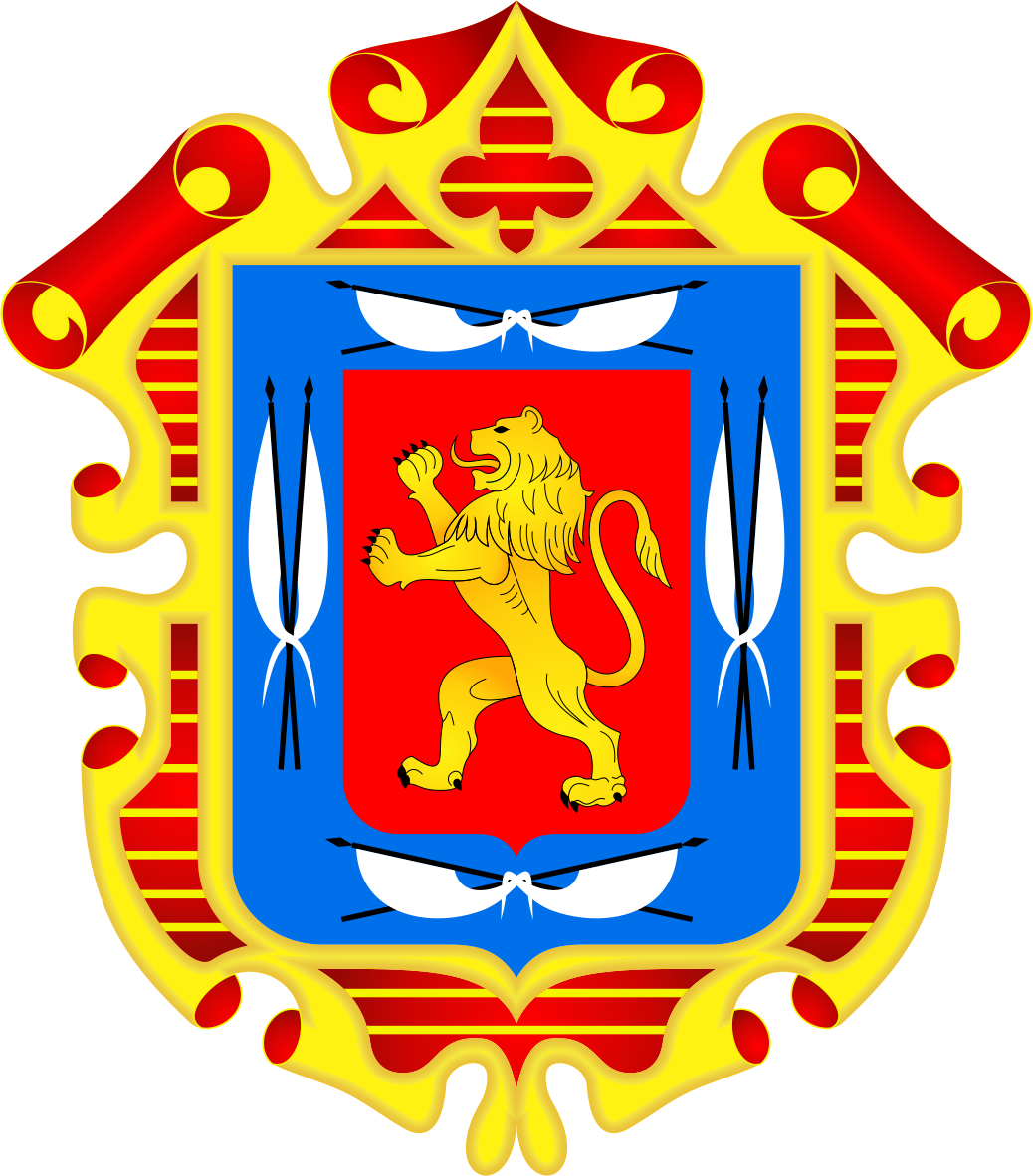
- Flag Seal

- Location within Peru
- Coordinates: 6°13′S 77°51′W
- Country: Peru
- Region: Amazonas
- Province: Chachapoyas
- District: Chachapoyas
- Founded: September 5, 1538
- Founder: Alonso de Alvarado

Government
  - Mayor: Víctor Raúl Culqui Puerta

Area
  - Total: 12.3 km^{2} (4.7 sq mi)
- Elevation: 2,335 m (7,661 ft)

Population (2017 census)
  - Total: 32,026
  - Estimate (2015): 29,869
  - Density: 2,600/km^{2} (6,740/sq mi)
- Time zone: UTC-5 (PET)
- Postal code: 477002
- Climate: Cfb
- Website: www.munichachapoyas.gob.pe

Chachapoyas (Spanish pronunciation: [tʃa.tʃaˈpo.ʝas]) is a city in northern Peru at an elevation of 2,335 meters (7,661 ft). The city has a population of 32,026 people (2017). Situated in the mountains far from the Peruvian coast, Chachapoyas remains fairly isolated from other regions of Peru. It is served by buses to Chiclayo and Cajamarca, and flights to domestic locations from Chachapoyas Airport.

The city of Chachapoyas is the capital of the Amazonas Region. It was founded on September 5, 1538, by the Spanish conquistador Alonso de Alvarado "and his twenty". Local agriculture includes sugar cane, orchid and coffee growing. Chachapoyas' transitional location between the arid Cordillera Occidental and Cordillera Central and the rainy, rainforested Cordillera Oriental, allow it to receive generally moderate annual precipitation without experiencing the copiously excessive, tropical-rainforest-like precipitation amounts in towns farther east such as Moyobamba.

== History ==
Named San Juan de la Frontera de los Chachapoyas, the city was first established near La Jalca, and then near Levanto. The city's original locations were abandoned due to climate, disease and a lack of defenses against rebelling local groups. The location of the city changed several times, until it was settled in the place that it now occupies at 2334 m. At first the date of settlement had not been specified. It is believed that the Spanish colonials moved the city to its present location in 1545.

The city still preserves its wide colonial casonas of big courts and lounges, with roofs made of tiles. Its Plaza de Armas is located to the west of the city and it is a perfect quadrilateral of 100 m. per side. Located on the south side of the plaza is a monument to the "Hero of Arica", colonel Francisco Bolognesi.

From the viceroyalty period dates the legend that the Indian chief Pantoja asked the viceroy for permission to put a gold roof in his house. This and other treasures would be hidden in one of the 40 caves that surround the city.

At one time there was a lagoon surrounded with totoras (a type of bulrush) and palm trees. From these plants, wood was used to build the churches of the city. The Kuélap stadium now stands on this location.

== Geography ==
From the route of Bagua towards the Mayo River and Huallaga Central, a branch detaches itself, following the course of the Utcubamba River and leading to Chachapoyas.

The city's geographical location has determined its isolation until recently, when better roads were constructed between Chachapoyas and the cities of the northern Peruvian coast. Chachapoyas is surrounded by extensive and matted wooded formations. During the rainy season, these formations are covered with a thick haze, from which the city's name may be derived (from the Quechua word: sachapuyos, meaning "mount of haze"). Another interpretation of the name Chachapoyas is the one that alludes its meaning of "strong male"..

=== Climate ===
In this part of Peru, located in the eyebrow of the jungle, the climate is subtropical highland but ever humid, described by the Köppen climate classification as Cfb, with an average temperature of 18 °C and an average relative humidity of 74 percent. However, in some areas the temperature can drop to 2 °C. Chachapoyas has a temperate climate and is moderately rainy. The annual average of maximum and minimum temperature (period 1960–1991) is 19.8 °C and 9.2 °C, respectively. Annual average precipitation accumulated for period 1960-1991 is 777.8 mm.

Jiron Triunfo is the street which links the three principal plazas of the city. It is called by this name because the victorious Chachapoyans of the Higos Urco battle entered the city through here. Chacapoyas' transitional location between the arid Cordillera Occidental and Cordillera Central and the rainy, rainforested Cordillera Oriental, allow it to receive a generally moderate annual precipitation amount without receiving the copiously excessive, tropical-rainforest-like precipitation amounts farther east in towns such as Moyobamba.

Climate data for Chachapoyas, elevation 2,442 m (8,012 ft), (1991–2020)
Month	Jan	Feb	Mar	Apr	May	Jun	Jul	Aug	Sep	Oct	Nov	Dec	Year
Mean daily maximum °C (°F)	19.9 (67.8)	19.6 (67.3)	19.6 (67.3)	19.9 (67.8)	20.2 (68.4)	19.9 (67.8)	19.6 (67.3)	20.3 (68.5)	20.5 (68.9)	20.6 (69.1)	21.1 (70.0)	20.0 (68.0)	20.1 (68.2)
Mean daily minimum °C (°F)	10.8 (51.4)	11.1 (52.0)	11.2 (52.2)	11.0 (51.8)	10.7 (51.3)	9.6 (49.3)	8.6 (47.5)	8.6 (47.5)	9.3 (48.7)	10.5 (50.9)	10.7 (51.3)	11.1 (52.0)	10.3 (50.5)
Average precipitation mm (inches)	86.5 (3.41)	103.9 (4.09)	126.8 (4.99)	81.7 (3.22)	47.2 (1.86)	23.1 (0.91)	18.3 (0.72)	20.9 (0.82)	36.8 (1.45)	91.5 (3.60)	66.5 (2.62)	89.0 (3.50)	792.2 (31.19)
Source: National Meteorology and Hydrology Service of Peru

== Tourist attractions ==
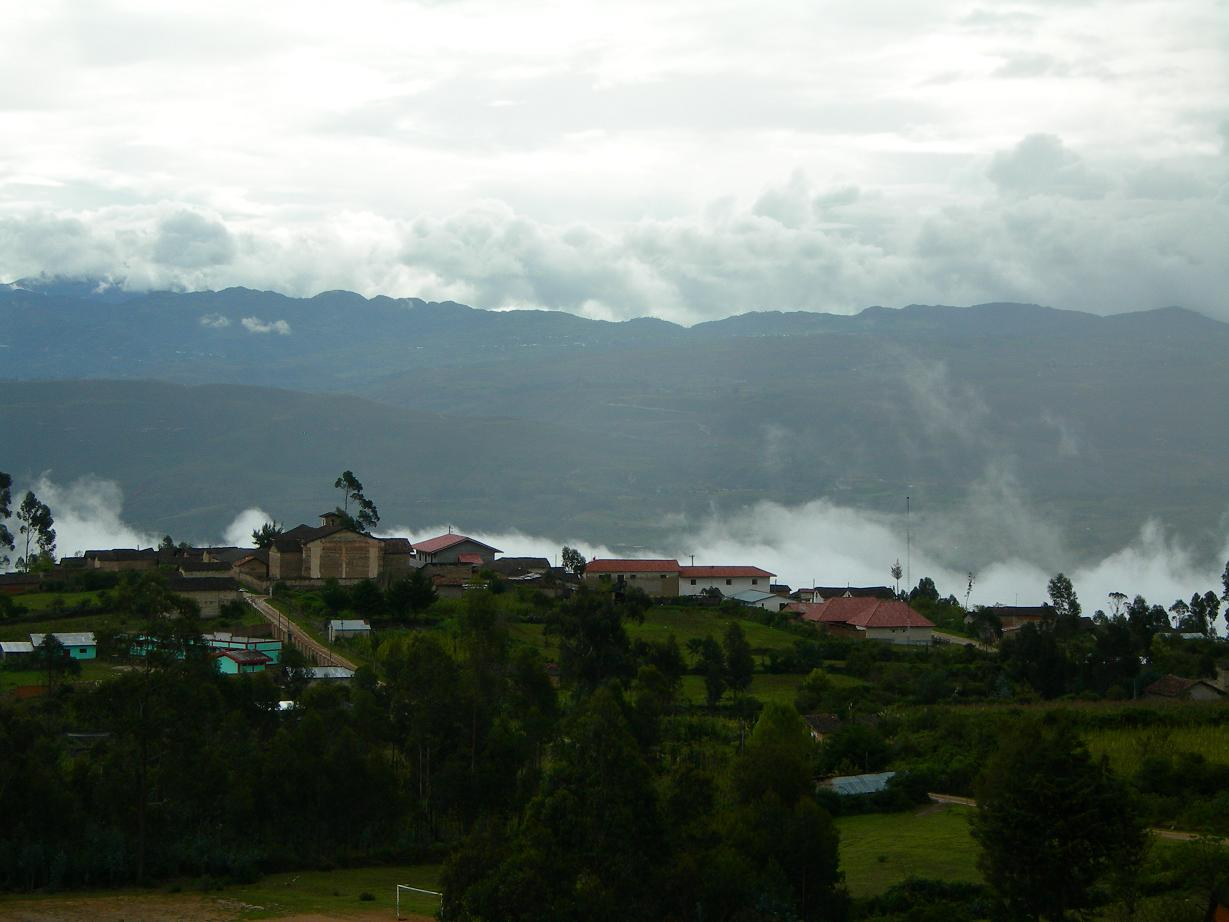
Huancas.

=== Independence Square ===
To the east of the city is the Independence Square. In this square there is a monument to the Chachapoyas heroes of the Higos Urco battle of June 6, 1821. It is said that Plaza Santa Ana was the first square in the city. Here the first church of Chachapoyas was built. People used to celebrate the San Juan de los Indios' festivities in this square with eight days of bullfighting.

=== Luya Urco ===
Luya Urqu (Luya Urco) is a hill located to the west of the city. In this place stands the well of Yana Yaku (Pozo de Yanayacu), originally known as the Fuente Cuyana. The well was constructed in the same place in which, according to legend, Santo Toribio de Mogrovejo brought forth water from a rock, ending the drought that was plaguing the region. The legend of the well is that any man who drinks from its waters will be forever attracted by the charm of the city's women

=== Cuyana Fountain ===
This fountain of legend was in the skirt of Luya Urco hill and had two jets, one of good and one of evil. According to the legend, when a person drank water from the first jet, love was born, but from the second one hate or negligence was produced. In the city, it was said that the foreigner who drank from this "fountain of love", would be forever captivated by its beautiful women and its wonderful grounds that are full of delight.

=== The Lagoon ===
At one time there was a lagoon surrounded with totoras (a type of bulrush) and palm trees. From these plants, wood was used to build the churches of the city. The Kuélap stadium is now in this location.

=== Legón Hill ===
Legón Hill is located in the town of Higos Urco, 2 km from the city.

=== Petroglyphs of Pitaya ===
An archaeological site with about 3,000 years old located 20 km from the city of Chachapoyas, in the Huancas district. It is about 30 graphic representations of various species of flora and fauna. Some of these images also refer to hunting days.

== Notable people ==
- Pedro de Añazco, Jesuit missionary
- Gisela Ortiz, human rights activist and politician
- Hernán Rengifo, footballer
- Toribio Rodríguez de Mendoza, academic
- Blas Valera, writer

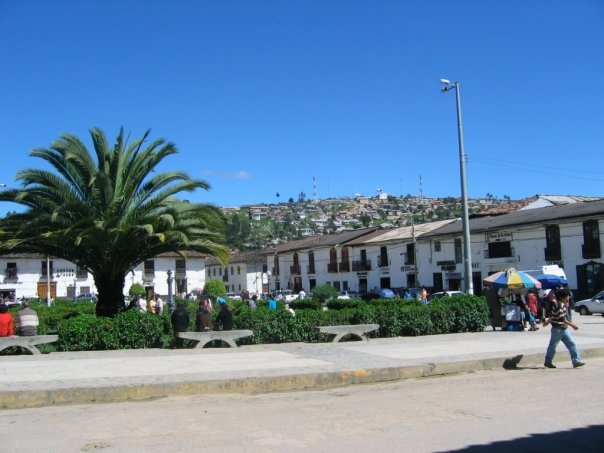
Buildings in Chachapoyas

== See also ==
- 1928 Chachapoyas earthquake
- Chachapoyas culture
- Chachapoyas Province
