= Cochabamba (archaeological site) =

Archaeological site in Peru

Coordinates: 6.9361°S 77.8598°W

- Location within Peru
- Cultures: Inca
- Location: Peru; Amazonas Region

Cochabamba (possibly from Quechua qucha lake, pampa a large plain) is an archaeological site of the Inca period in Peru. It is situated in the Amazonas Region, Chachapoyas Province, Chuquibamba District, near the village of Chuquibamba.

== See also ==
- Machu Pirqa
- Purum Llaqta
