= Granada District =

Granada
- District
- Interactive map of Granada
- Coordinates: 6°3′15″S 77°36′55″W
- Country: Peru
- Region: Amazonas
- Province: Chachapoyas
- Founded: November 3, 1933
- Capital: Granada

Government
  - Mayor: Enoc Pilco Valle

Area
  - Total: 181.41 km^{2} (70.04 sq mi)
- Elevation: 3,013 m (9,885 ft)

Population (2005 census)
  - Total: 643
  - Density: 3.54/km^{2} (9.18/sq mi)
- Time zone: UTC-5 (PET)
- UBIGEO: 010107

Granada District is one of twenty-one districts of the province Chachapoyas in Peru.
