= Sonche District =

Coordinates: 4°19′59″S 77°42′00″W

Sonche
- District
- Interactive map of Sonche
- Country: Peru
- Region: Amazonas
- Province: Chachapoyas
- Founded: April 7, 1954
- Capital: San Juan de Sonche

Government
  - Mayor: Segundo Miguel Garcia Alvarado

Area
  - Total: 113.26 km^{2} (43.73 sq mi)
- Elevation: 2,100 m (6,900 ft)

Population (2005 census)
  - Total: 237
  - Density: 2.09/km^{2} (5.42/sq mi)
- Time zone: UTC-5 (PET)
- UBIGEO: 010121

Sonche District is one of twenty-one districts of the province Chachapoyas in Peru.
