= Machu Pirqa =

Archaeological site in Peru

Coordinates: 6.3370°S 77.9130°W

- Interactive map of Machu Pirqa
- Location: Peru
- Region: Amazonas Region, Chachapoyas Province, Magdalena District

Site notes
- Height: 1,900 metres (6,234 ft)

Machu Pirqa (Quechua machu old, old person, pirqa wall, "old wall", hispanicized spelling Machupirca) is an archaeological site of the Chachapoyas culture in Peru. It is located in the Amazonas Region, Chachapoyas Province, Magdalena District. Machu Pirqa is situated at a height of about 1,900 metres (6,234 ft) on the left bank of the river Kuntichaka (Condechaca), an affluent of the Utcubamba River.

== See also ==
- Purum Llaqta
- Quchapampa
