= Levanto District =

Coordinates: 6°37′37″S 77°49′01″W

Levanto
- District
- Interactive map of Levanto
- Country: Peru
- Region: Amazonas
- Province: Chachapoyas
- Time zone: UTC-5 (PET)

Levanto is a district of the province of Chachapoyas.

== History ==
The area has been inhabited since pre-Hispanic times. It was one of the principal centers in the province of Chachapoyas. In 1538 Alonso de Alvarado founded the city of Chachapoyas, Peru. There are an enormous quantity of archaeological sites, including nine archaeological sites of major importance.

== Demographics ==
According to the census carried out in 1993 and his projection. The district of Levanto has a population of 1,170 inhabitants for 2000 of whom 51% are men and the difference of 49% are women; most of the population is located in the Urban area with 57%; and in Rural area 43%, being his valuation of population growth raised in the order of 2.6%. 58% of the population is under the age of 25.
