= Chachapoyas District =

Coordinates: 6°13′01″S 77°51′00″W

Chachapoyas
- District
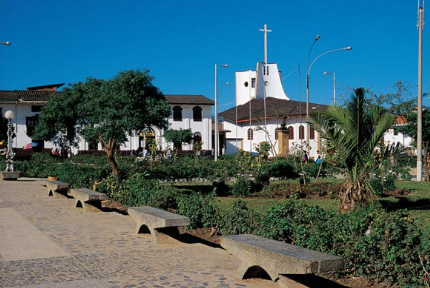
- Interactive map of Chachapoyas
- Country: Peru
- Region: Amazonas
- Province: Chachapoyas
- Capital: Chachapoyas, Peru

Government
  - Mayor: Víctor Raúl Culqui Puerta (2019-2022)

Area
  - Total: 153.78 km^{2} (59.37 sq mi)
- Elevation: 2,335 m (7,661 ft)

Population (2017)
  - Total: 32,589
  - Density: 211.92/km^{2} (548.87/sq mi)
- Time zone: UTC-5 (PET)
- UBIGEO: 010101

Chachapoyas District is one of twenty-one districts of Chachapoyas Province in Peru.

== Climate ==
Climate data for Chachapoyas, elevation 2,442 m (8,012 ft), (1991–2020)
Month	Jan	Feb	Mar	Apr	May	Jun	Jul	Aug	Sep	Oct	Nov	Dec	Year
Mean daily maximum °C (°F)	19.9 (67.8)	19.6 (67.3)	19.6 (67.3)	19.9 (67.8)	20.2 (68.4)	19.9 (67.8)	19.6 (67.3)	20.3 (68.5)	20.5 (68.9)	20.6 (69.1)	21.1 (70.0)	20.0 (68.0)	20.1 (68.2)
Mean daily minimum °C (°F)	10.8 (51.4)	11.1 (52.0)	11.2 (52.2)	11.0 (51.8)	10.7 (51.3)	9.6 (49.3)	8.6 (47.5)	8.6 (47.5)	9.3 (48.7)	10.5 (50.9)	10.7 (51.3)	11.1 (52.0)	10.3 (50.5)
Average precipitation mm (inches)	86.5 (3.41)	103.9 (4.09)	126.8 (4.99)	81.7 (3.22)	47.2 (1.86)	23.1 (0.91)	18.3 (0.72)	20.9 (0.82)	36.8 (1.45)	91.5 (3.60)	66.5 (2.62)	89.0 (3.50)	792.2 (31.19)
Source: National Meteorology and Hydrology Service of Peru

== See also ==
- Administrative divisions of Peru
