= Soloco District =

Coordinates: 6°16′01″S 77°43′01″W

Soloco
- District
- Interactive map of Soloco
- Country: Peru
- Region: Amazonas
- Province: Chachapoyas
- Created: February 5, 1861
- Capital: Soloco

Government
  - Mayor: Celso Bardales Montoya

Area
  - Total: 84.48 km^{2} (32.62 sq mi)
- Elevation: 2,660 m (8,730 ft)

Population (2005 census)
  - Total: 1,613
  - Density: 19.09/km^{2} (49.45/sq mi)
- Time zone: UTC-5 (PET)
- UBIGEO: 010121

Soloco is one of twenty-one districts of Chachapoyas Province, in Peru.

== Geography ==
Soloco is located in the high mountains. In the north the District of Soloco has border with the District of San an Francisco de Daguas (Chachapoyas) and the District of Molinopampa (Chachapoyas), in the East with the District of Cheto (Chachapoyas), in the south with the District of Cochamal (Chachapoyas) and the District of San Isidro of Maino (Chachapoyas), in the west with the District of Chachapoyas and the District of Levanto (Chachapoyas).

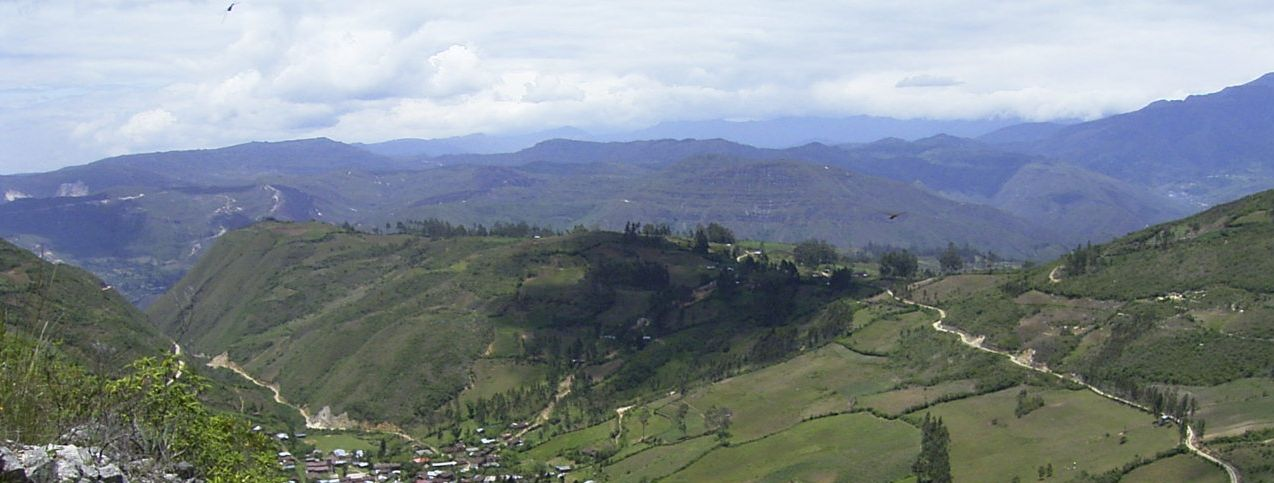
The district of Soloco

== Attractions ==
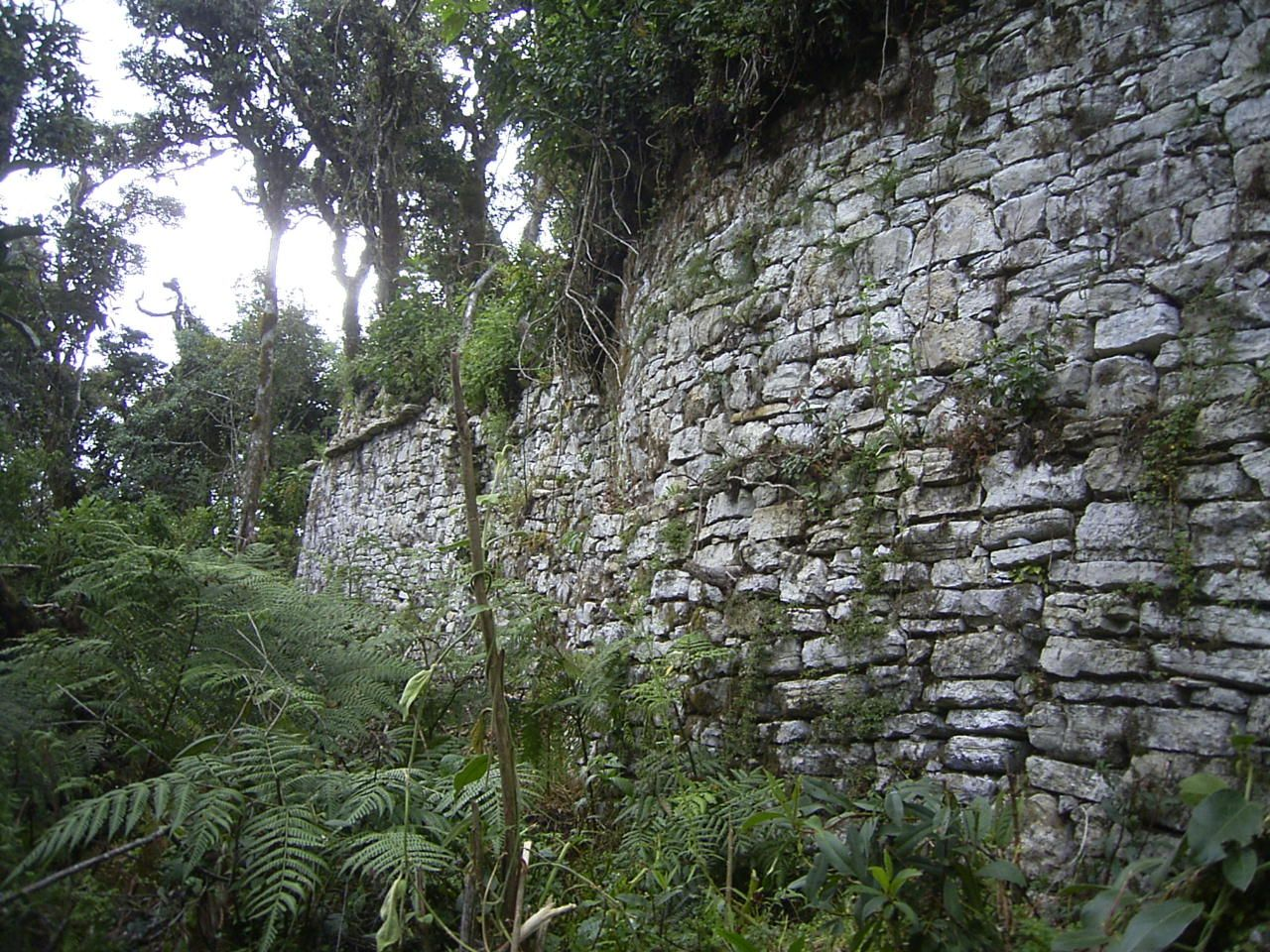
A wall from the Soloco fortress, built by some ancient people of Soloco.

Soloco offers several tourist attractions, such as the Ruins of Soloco, a fortress of extraordinary size.

The capital city of Soloco observes its management holiday on September 28. Additionally, the holiday of Our Lord of the Miracles takes place on October 18, representing a major public observance for the local population.

Typical meals are the Sancochado the Purtumute, Locro de Chochoca and cuy with potatoes. Soloco belongs to the Parish of Chachapoyas that is attended by two Priests of the Diocese of Chachapoyas.
