= Cheto District =

Coordinates: 4°19′59″S 77°42′00″W

Cheto
- District
- Interactive map of Cheto
- Country: Peru
- Region: Amazonas
- Province: Chachapoyas
- Founded: January 9, 1953
- Capital: Cheto

Government
  - Mayor: Elita Culquimboz Huaman

Area
  - Total: 56.97 km^{2} (22.00 sq mi)
- Elevation: 2,500 m (8,200 ft)

Population (2005 census)
  - Total: 686
  - Density: 12.0/km^{2} (31.2/sq mi)
- Time zone: UTC-5 (PET)
- UBIGEO: 010104

Cheto is a district of the Chachapoyas Province in the Amazonas Region in Peru. Its seat is Cheto located at an altitude of 2,500 m.s.n.m..

During the 2005 Peru census the district had 686 inhabitants.

== See also ==
- Purum Llaqta
