= Quinjalca District =

Coordinates: 6°01′59″S 77°37′01″W

Quinjalca
- District
- Interactive map of Quinjalca
- Country: Peru
- Region: Amazonas
- Province: Chachapoyas
- Founded: February 5, 1861
- Capital: Quinjalca

Government
  - Mayor: Braulio Baldemar Goñas Culqui

Area
  - Total: 91.59 km^{2} (35.36 sq mi)
- Elevation: 3,065 m (10,056 ft)

Population (2005 census)
  - Total: 1,109
  - Density: 12.11/km^{2} (31.36/sq mi)
- Time zone: UTC-5 (PET)
- UBIGEO: 010117

Quinjalca District is one of twenty-one districts of the province Chachapoyas in Peru.
