= Mercosur =

South American trade bloc

Southern Common Market
(in official languages)
Aymara	Uksankir Qhathu
Spanish	Mercado Común del Sur
Guarani	Ñemby Ñemuha
Portuguese	Mercado Comum do Sul
Quechua	Lawpi Qhatu
- Spanish (left) and Portuguese (right) flag of Mercosur
Motto:
"Our north is the South"
- - Spanish: Nuestro norte es el Sur
  - Portuguese: Nosso norte é o Sul
  - Guarani: Yvy mba'e yvate ojehegui
  - Aymara: Jiwasan alay tuqinx aynach tuqinkiwa
  - Quechua: Nortenchikqa Surmi
- Member states Associated states Suspended member
- Headquarters and capital city: Montevideo
- Largest city: São Paulo
- Recognized languages: Portuguese; Spanish; Guarani
- Type: Intergovernmental organization and customs union
- Membership: 5 members: Argentina; Bolivia; Brazil; Paraguay; Uruguay; 1 suspended: Venezuela; 7 associated: Chile; Colombia; Ecuador; Guyana; Panama; Peru; Suriname

Leaders
  - President pro tempore: Yamandú Orsi
  - President of Parlasur: Arlindo Chinaglia
- Legislature: Parlasur

Formation
  - Iguaçu Declaration: 30 November 1985
  - Buenos Aires Act: 6 July 1990
  - Treaty of Asunción: 26 March 1991
  - Protocol of Ouro Preto: 16 December 1994

Area
  - Total: 14,869,775 km^{2} (5,741,252 sq mi)
  - Water (%): 1.0

Population
  - 2024 estimate: ▲295,007,000
  - Density: 23/km^{2} (59.6/sq mi)
- GDP (PPP): 2024 estimate
  - Total: ▲US$6.681 trillion
  - Per capita: ▲US$23,259
- GDP (nominal): 2022 estimate
  - Total: ▲US$2.638 trillion
  - Per capita: ▲US$9,643
- HDI (2023): ▲0.800 very high
- Currency: 5 currencies: (ARS) Peso; (BOB) Boliviano; (BRL) Real; (PYG) Guaraní; (UYU) Peso
- Time zone: UTC-2 to UTC-5
- Date format: dd/mm/yyyy (CE)
- Website www.mercosur.int

The Southern Common Market (Note: Spanish: Mercado Común del Sur; Portuguese: Mercado Comum do Sul; Guarani: Ñemby Ñemuha) (commonly known by abbreviations Mercosur in Spanish and Mercosul in Portuguese) is a South American trade bloc established by the Treaty of Asunción in 1991 and Protocol of Ouro Preto in 1994. Its full members are Argentina, Bolivia, Brazil, Paraguay, and Uruguay. Venezuela is a full member but has been suspended since 1 December 2016. Chile, Colombia, Ecuador, Guyana, Panama, Peru, and Suriname are associate countries.

Mercosur's origins are linked to discussions for the constitution of a regional economic market for Latin America, which go back to the treaty that established the Latin American Free Trade Association in 1960, which was succeeded by the Latin American Integration Association in the 1980s. At the time, Argentina and Brazil made progress in the matter, signing the Iguaçu Declaration (1985), which established a bilateral commission, followed by a series of trade agreements the following year. The Integration, Cooperation and Development Treaty, signed between the two countries in 1988, set the goal of establishing a common market that other Latin American countries could join. Paraguay and Uruguay joined the process and the four countries signed the Treaty of Asunción (1991), which established the Southern Common Market, a trade alliance aimed at boosting the regional economy, moving goods, people among themselves, workforce and capital. Initially a free trade zone was established, in which the signatory countries would not tax or restrict each other's imports. As of 1 January 1995, this area became a customs union, in which all signatories could charge the same quotas on imports from other countries (common external tariff). The following year, Bolivia and Chile acquired membership and associate status respectively. Other Latin American nations have expressed interest in joining the group.

Mercosur's purpose is to promote free trade within the zone and the fluid movement of goods, people, and currency. Its functions have been updated and amended many times; it currently confines itself to a customs union, in which there is free intra-zone trade and a common trade policy between member countries. Beyond trade, Mercosur prioritizes deeper regional integration by enabling the free movement of people across borders, supported through its December 2014 agreement with the International Organization for Migration. In 2023, the Mercosur generated a nominal annual gross domestic product (GDP) (PPP) of around 5.7 trillion US dollars, placing the bloc as the 5th largest economy in the world. The bloc places very high on the human development index.

== History ==
=== Background ===
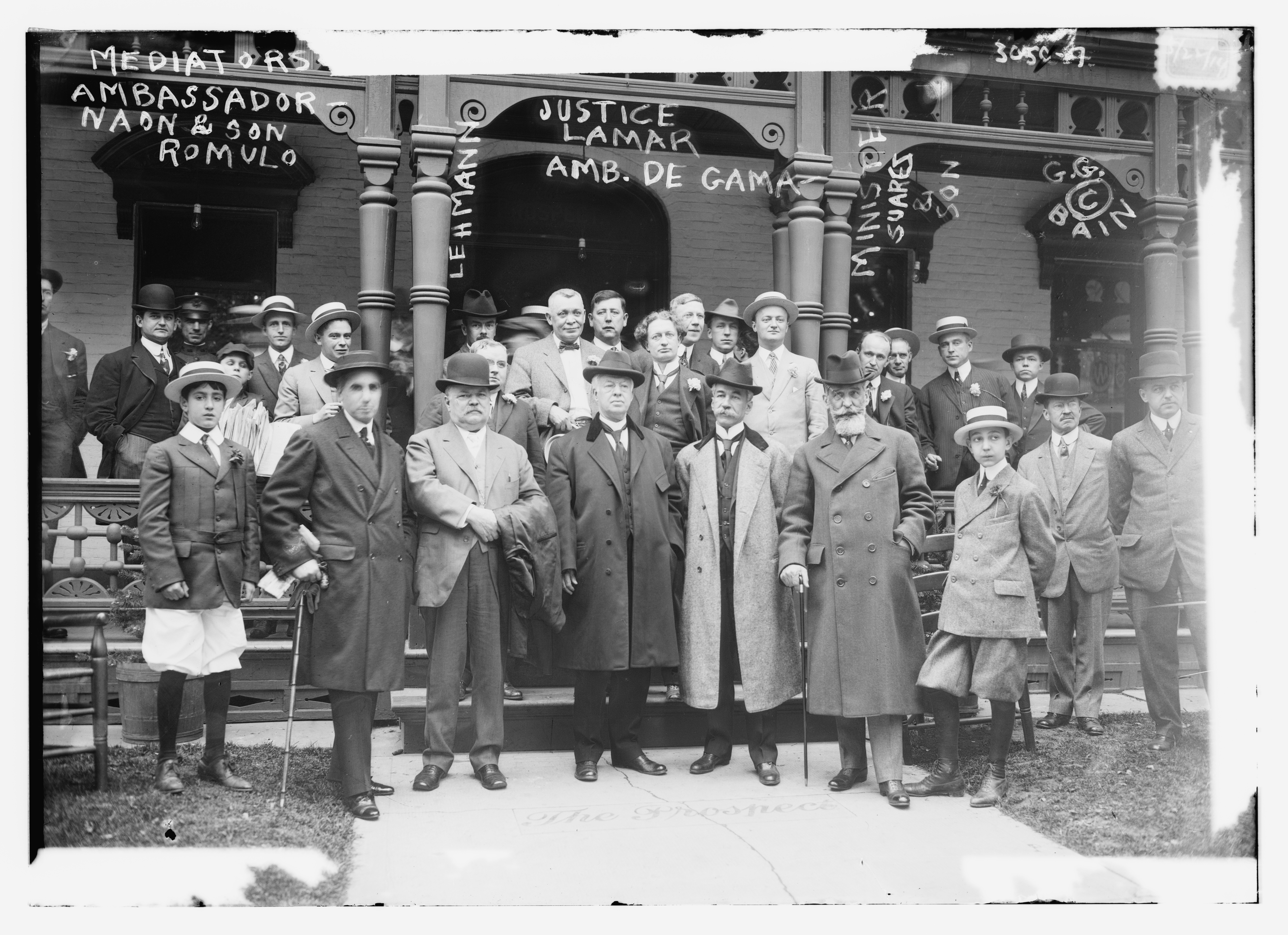
Representatives of Argentina, Brazil and Chile at the Niagara Falls Peace Conference, where they mediated the Mexican revolutionary affair at the request of the United States, advocating the rise of the ABC countries, a political and economic pact among these three nations in 1915

Before the independence of the South American countries, most of their commercial and political ties were mediated by the Spanish Empire, which prohibited significant trade with Brazil. In the 19th century, the process of political emancipation in South America accentuated the various competing interests of the countries of the region. They often found themselves at war, such as the Cisplatine War, the independence of the Republic of Uruguay, the Uruguayan Great War, the Ragamuffin War, the dispute between unitaries and federalists in Argentina and the Paraguayan War.

In 1941, in the middle of the Second World War, Brazil and Argentina for the first time tried to create a Customs Union between their economies. However, this did not happen due to the countries' diplomatic differences in relation to Axis policies, after the attack on Pearl Harbor. With the end of the war, the need for interaction between nations became imminent and, consequently, economic blocs formed. In Latin America, however, there was no union that obtained satisfactory results.

=== Foz do Iguaçu Declaration ===
In December 1985, Brazilian President José Sarney and Argentine President Raúl Alfonsín signed the Iguaçu Declaration, the basis for economic integration of the so-called Southern Cone. Both countries had just come out of a dictatorial period and were facing the need to redirect their economies to the outside and globalized world.

Both countries had contracted a large external debt during the period of the military governments and did not enjoy credit abroad. There was a great need for investment in the countries, but no money. This common situation made them both realize the mutual need. Shortly after the signing of the Iguaçu Declaration in February 1986, Argentina declared its intention of a "preferential association" with Brazil. In a private home in Don Torcuato, there was a meeting to discuss the matter. The discussion, lasting two days, took place in an atmosphere of exchanging ideas and stating positions regarding the status of the area's economy.

After a few weeks, Brazil invited Argentina to a similar meeting, in Itaipava, also in a private residence. This signaled acceptance of the Argentine initiative and the formation of an agreement, with the objective of promoting the economic development of both countries and integrating them into the world. Out of this meeting came the Argentina-Brazil Integration and Economics Cooperation Program or PICE (Portuguese: Programa de Integração e Cooperação Econômica Argentina-Brasil, Spanish: Programa de Integración y Cooperación Económica Argentina-Brasil). Protocol Number 20 of the program proposed the Gaucho as a currency for regional trade. For many, the idea of integration in South America seemed more like an abstraction, owing to various unsuccessful experiences in the past. However, this was perceived as different.

=== Buenos Aires Act ===
On 6 July 1990, the President of Brazil, Fernando Collor, and the President of Argentina, Carlos Menem, signed the Buenos Aires Act aimed at total customs integration between the two countries. It was decided that all measures for the construction of the customs union should be completed by 31 December 1994. To ensure compliance with the deadlines, the Binational Working Group was created, the body whose responsibility was to define methods for creating the common market between the two nations. In September, the governments of Paraguay and Uruguay showed a strong interest in the regional integration process, leading to the full perception by the signatories that a more comprehensive treaty was needed.

=== Founding ===
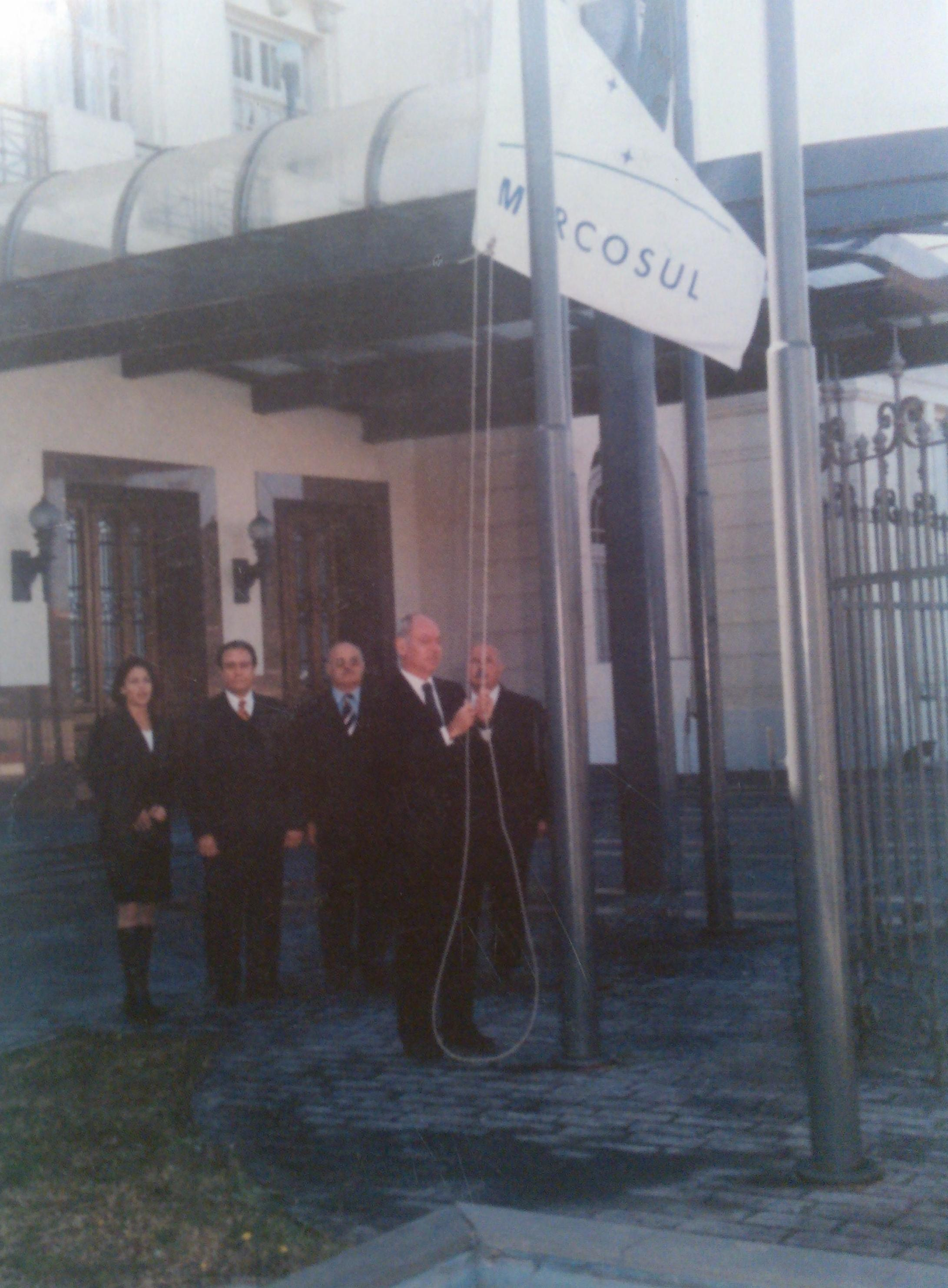
First lifting headquarters of Mercosur in Montevideo (2001)

Mercosur was finally established in 1991 by the Treaty of Asunción, based on the Buenos Aires Act, the Treaty of Asunción defined rules and conditions for the creation of a free trade zone among its four signatories. Likewise, it was decided that all measures for the construction of the common market should be completed by 31 December 1994 with the amendment of the Treaty of Ouro Preto. In 2001, celebrating the 10th anniversary of the bloc's creation, the Mercosur flag was hoisted for the first time at Mercosur's headquarters in Montevideo. The main implications of this free trade zone are:

- The free movement of goods, services and productive factors between countries, through the elimination of customs duties and non-tariff restrictions on the movement of goods and any other measure to the same effect, with the establishment of a common external tariff and the adoption of a common commercial policy towards third countries or economic blocs;
- Products originating in the territory of a signatory country will have, in another signatory country, the same treatment applied to products of national origin;
- The coordination of foreign trade, agricultural, industrial, fiscal, monetary, foreign exchange and capital policies, of others that are agreed, in order to ensure adequate conditions of competition between members, with the commitment of these countries to harmonize their legislation, especially in areas of general importance, to strengthen the integration process;
- In relations with non-signatory countries, members of the bloc will ensure equal conditions of trade. In this way, they will apply their national laws to inhibit imports whose prices are influenced by subsidies, dumping or any other unfair practice. At the same time, the bloc's countries will coordinate their respective national policies in order to develop common rules on trade competition.

It was defined that during the transition period, the signatory countries would adopt a general regime of origin, a system for resolving disputes and safeguard clauses. To ensure order and compliance with deadlines, two institutional bodies were created:

- Common Market Group: a body formed by four full members and four alternate members from each country, from the respective Ministry of Foreign Affairs, Ministry of Economy and Central Bank. Until the creation of the Arbitral Tribunals, the Common Market Group was the main authority in resolving disputes;
- Common Market Council: the institution with the highest authority in the treaty, created to manage political decisions and ensure compliance with established deadlines.

The Treaty of Asunción also decided that the accession of a new member, in order to be effective, must be approved by legislative decree in all signatory countries. Otherwise, the membership process will be invalid. The founding of the Mercosur Parliament was agreed upon at the December 2004 presidential summit. Up to 2010 it was planned to have 18 representatives from each country, regardless of population.

=== Venezuela adhesion and suspension of Paraguay ===
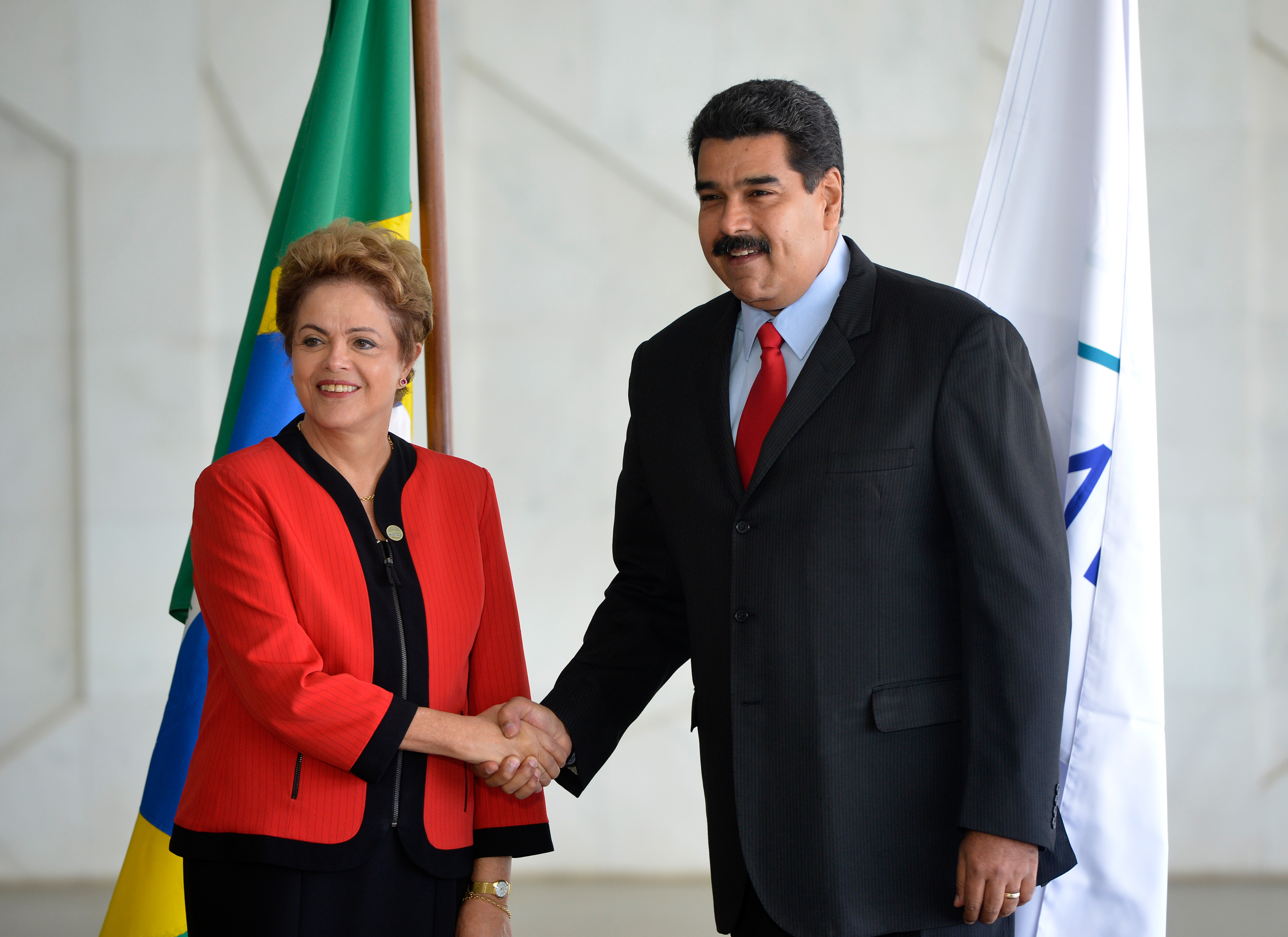
President of Brazil Dilma Rousseff hosting the President of Venezuela Nicolás Maduro during the XLVIII Mercosur meeting in 2015

Venezuela's history in Mercosur began on 16 December 2003 during a Mercosur summit held in Montevideo, when the Mercosur Economic Complementation Agreement with Colombia, Ecuador, and Venezuela was signed. This agreement established a timetable for the creation of a free trade zone among the signatory states and the full members of Mercosur, with a gradual reduction in tariffs. In this way, these countries were successful in negotiations for the formation of a free trade zone with Mercosur, since an economic complementation agreement, with full compliance with its schedule, is the item required for the rise of a new associate. On 8 July 2004, Venezuela was elevated to associate member status, without even completing the schedule agreed with the Common Market Council.

The following year, the bloc recognized it as an associated nation in the process of accession, which in practice meant that the state had a voice, but not a vote. The Caribbean country's Accession Protocol was signed in 2006 by all presidents of countries in the bloc. Subsequently, the Uruguayan and Argentine congresses approved the entry of the new member. The Brazilian congress did so only in December 2009; however, the Paraguayan congress did not approve it and, therefore, made it impossible for the Caribbean nation to fully join. Subsequently, on 29 June 2012, in response to Fernando Lugo's summary dismissal of the presidency, the Mercosur presidents decreed the Paraguayan suspension until the next presidential election, in April 2013. A month later, the bloc presidents acknowledged their adhesion of Venezuela and several trade agreements have been signed. It was suggested that the decision could be reversed with the Paraguayan return by exercising its veto power, which was not the case.

The decision was the subject of controversy. For some economists, Venezuela's acceptance as a full member of Mercosur expands the bloc's economic importance and opens up new business and investment opportunities. However, for others, the decision was seen as hasty, imposed by the governments of Brazil and Argentina and motivated purely by political interests.

=== Bolivian membership ===
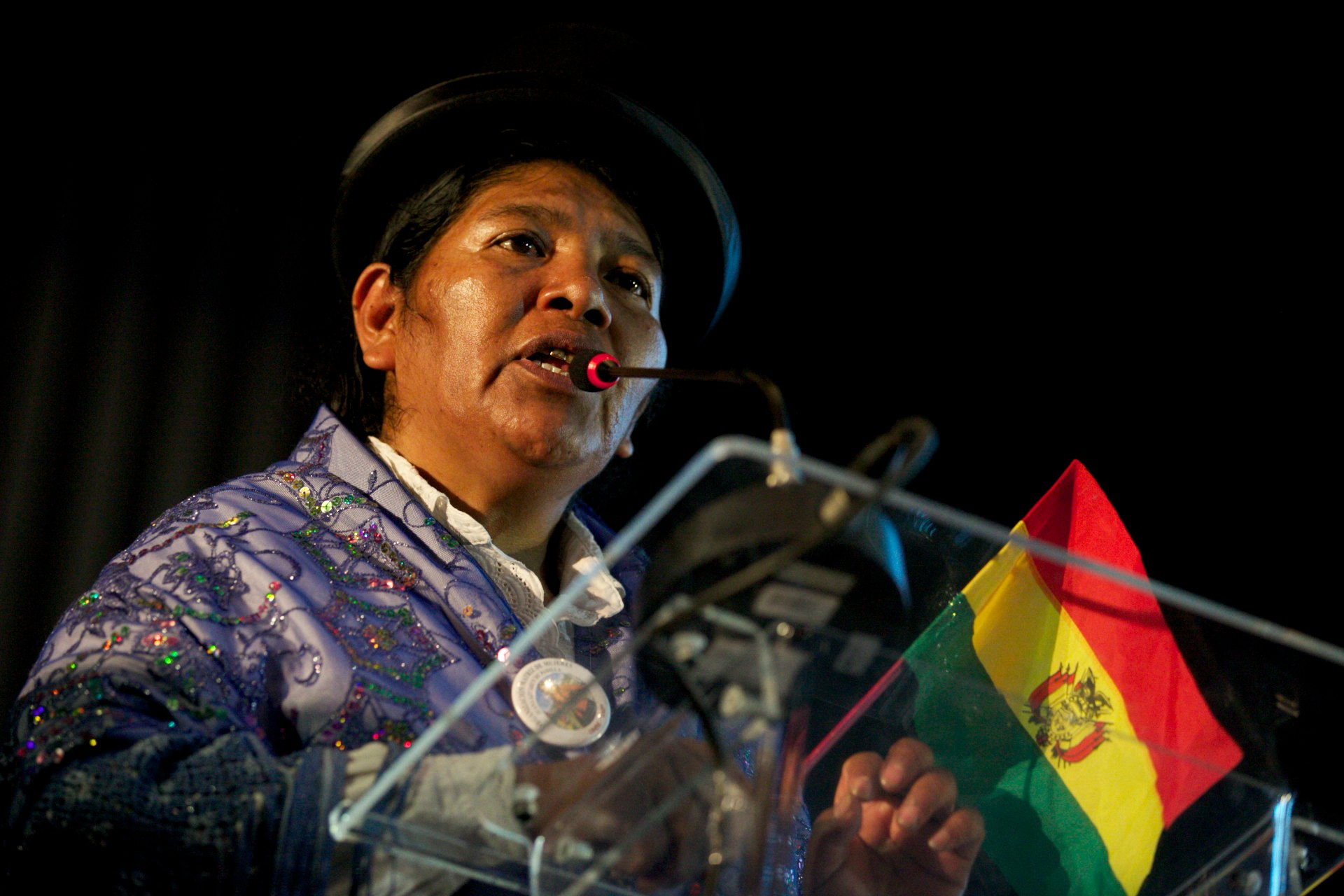
Bolivian representative speaking to the Mercosur members

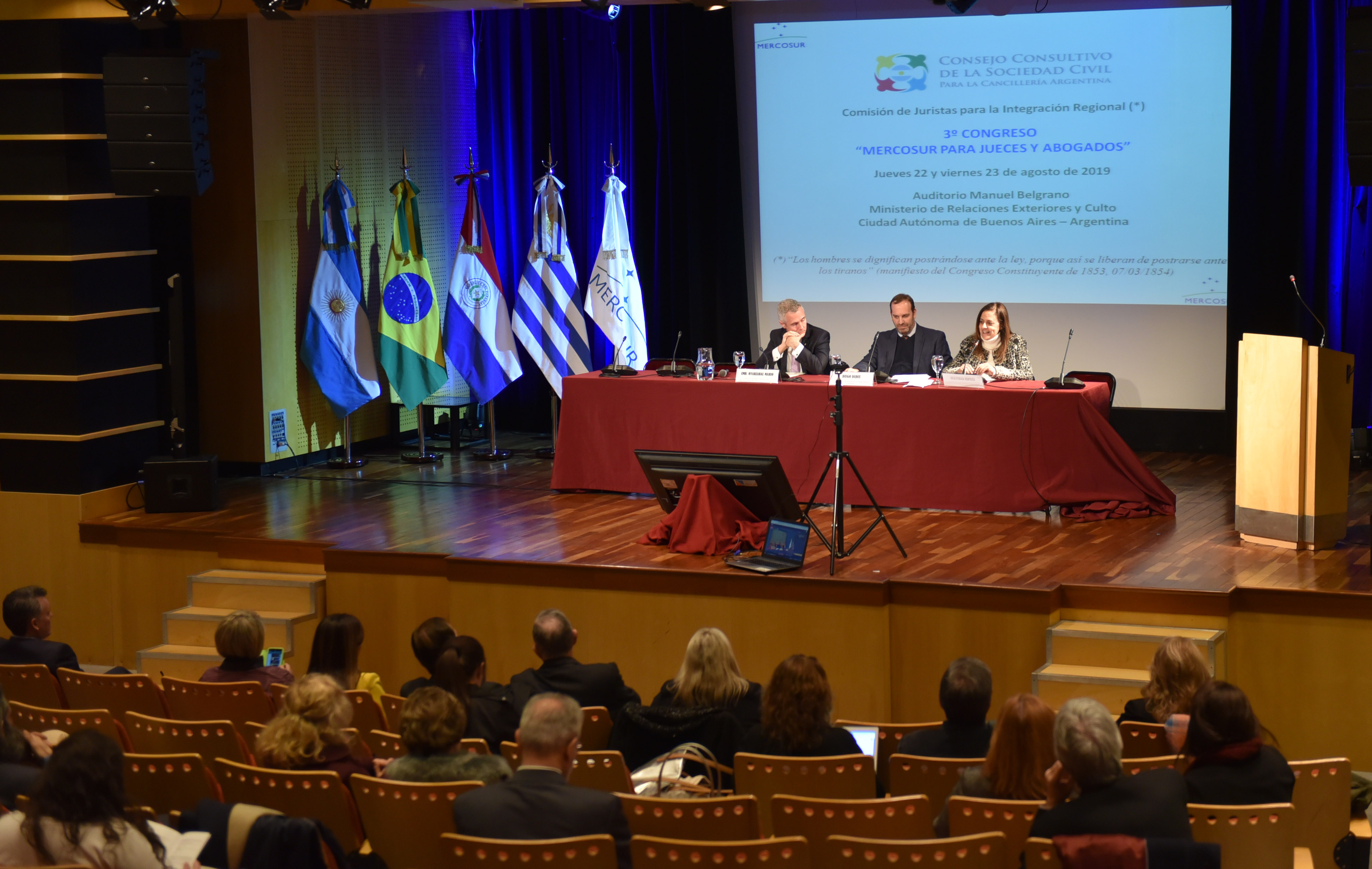
Mercosur members gathered at the Consultative Council for the Civil Society. The Venezuelan flag is not among those of the union's full member states.

On 7 December 2012, Bolivian President Evo Morales signed a protocol aimed at accession to full membership in the bloc. Such a proposal requires review and legislative approval. On 7 July 2015, the heads of Mercosur having decided to accept Bolivia's request to become a full member country, Bolivian president Evo Morales signed the Brasília protocol. However, full membership required all members states to ratify the procotol, which was completed in December 2023. That left only Bolivia's internal ratification process to be completed before it became a full member which came to fruition in July 2024. Bolivia will be required to adjust its law in accordance with Mercosur rules within four years from full membership.

=== Suspension of Venezuela ===
In August 2016, the presidents of Brazil, Argentina, and Paraguay, while present in Rio de Janeiro for the Olympic Games, met to discuss suspending Venezuela from Mercosur. The three countries were in doubt about whether Venezuela was complying with the union's requirements for full membership, citing human rights violations among other issues. In fact, Venezuela was rejected from assuming the presidency of Mercosur by those three countries, prompting a dispute that continued to the end of the year.

On 21 November 2016, Paraguayan Foreign Minister Eladio Loizaga announced that Venezuela would be suspended in December 2016 after the nation was given a three-month period to reform its laws to abide to Mercosur requirements, with Mercosur noting that "rules governing trade, politics, democracy and human rights" needed to be overhauled in Venezuela. On 1 December 2016, Venezuela was suspended from Mercosur.

On 5 August 2017, the foreign ministers of Argentina, Paraguay, Uruguay and Brazil affirmed that Venezuela's membership in Mercosur is suspended indefinitely in response to the "rupture of the democratic order" in that country following the 30 July 2017 Constituent Assembly elections. The bloc by-laws have no provision for expulsion. However, trade and migration policies stay without changes to avoid aggravating the social crisis. Brazilian Foreign Minister Aloysio Nunes said that Venezuela will remain suspended until the country "re-establishes democracy."

In January 2019, the opposition-majority National Assembly declared incumbent Nicolás Maduro's 2018 reelection invalid, entering a presidential crisis. During a July 2019 summit in Santa Fe, Argentina, the bloc called for "free, fair and transparent presidential elections, as soon as possible" in Venezuela. The presidents of the four member countries signed a statement expressing concern "for the grave crisis that Venezuela is going through, which is seriously affecting the humanitarian situation and human rights."

In 2020, Maduro's United Socialist Party of Venezuela and allied parties claimed to have captured 67 percent of seats in the National Assembly, but that election was also disputed by EU and U.S. officials. Nevertheless, since then Maduro has exercised majority control of the Venezuelan parliament, displacing Juan Guaidó from his oppositional presidency, and thus making a rejoining of Venezuela to Mercosur more critical.

=== Free Trade Agreements with EU and EAEU ===
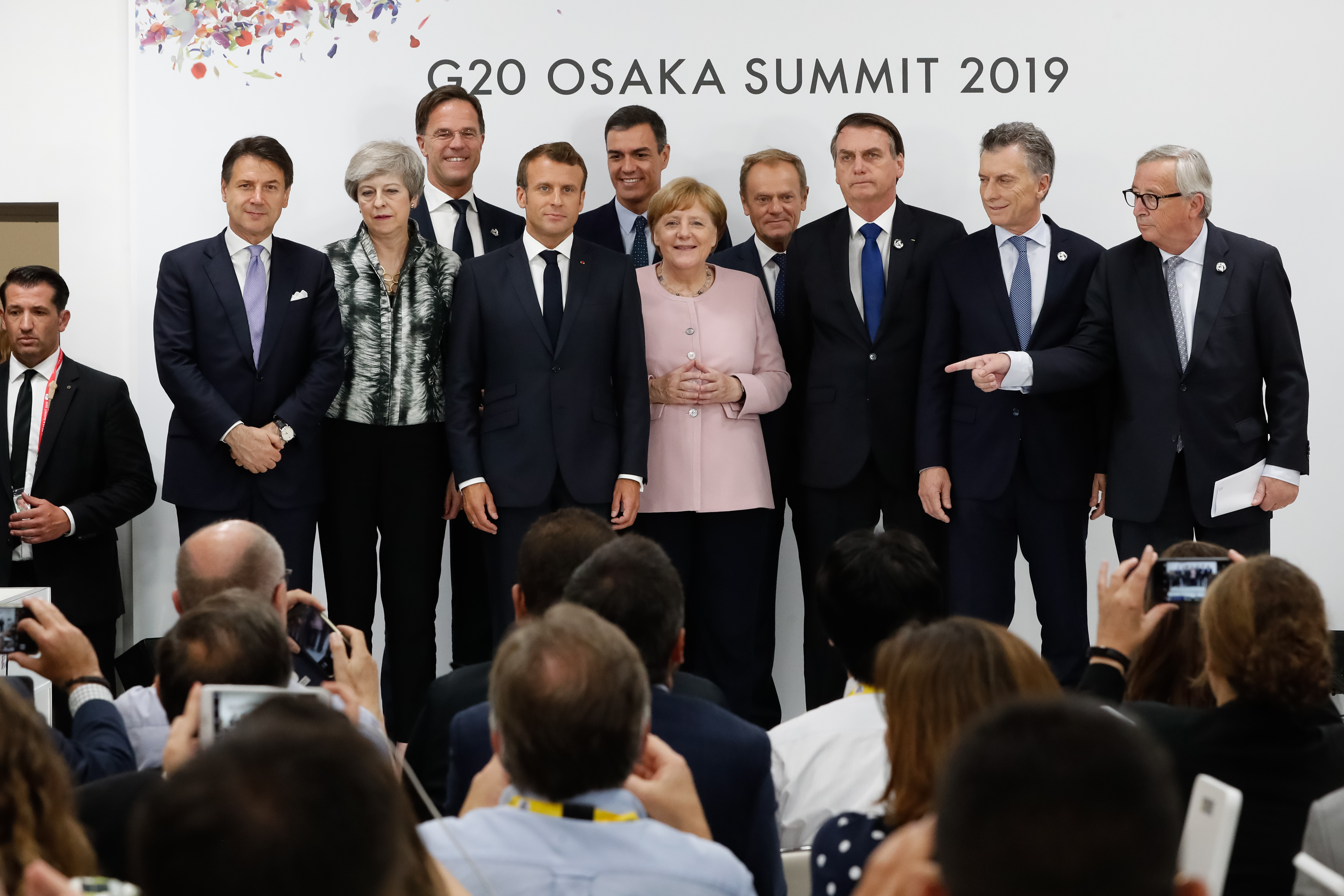
Mercosur and EU leaders in June 2019. The European Union–Mercosur Free Trade Agreement would form one of the world's largest free trade areas.

In late April 2023, newly elected President of Brazil Luiz Inácio Lula da Silva pressed new agreements between Mercosur and the EU to stimulate economic development in South America. Previously, EU officials doubted such an agreement, and did not ratify it due to the destruction of rainforest habitat in the Amazon region. At the same time, talks between Lula and Chinese leader Xi Jinping had competed with the expected free trade agreement to the European trade zone. As talks progressed, other factors came into play, such as the recent visit by Russian foreign minister Sergey Lavrov to Brazil the same month; the latter is working on the admission of Brazil and Mercosur to the competing Eurasian Economic Union (EAEU). Meanwhile, Venezuela, which was shut out of Mercosur membership in 2016 due to accusations of undemocratic behavior, is attempting to approach the agreement again with a decree to reform the common nomenclature and to revamp its quality standards for export.

=== Mercosur Waterways diplomatic crisis ===
In July 2023, a crisis broke out between Argentina and Paraguay, Bolivia, Uruguay and Brazil over the free navigability of the rivers in the Río de la Plata Basin.

=== Structural evolution ===
Structural evolution of Mercosur

Signed; Effective; Document	1980 Treaty of Montevideo	1985 (may) Act of Colonia	1985 (nov.) Foz do Iguaçu Declaration	1986 (jul.) Buenos Aires Act	1986 (aug.) PEC II	1986 (dec.) Act of Friendship	1988 (apr.) Act of Alvorada	1988 (nov.); 1989; Treaty for Integration, Cooperation, and Development	1990 Buenos Aires Act	1991; 1991; Treaty of Asunción	1994; 1995; Protocol of Ouro Preto
	Latin American Integration Association (ALADI)
			Argentina-Brazil bilateralism	Argentina-Brazil Integration and Economics Cooperation Program (PICE)						Southern Common Market (Mercosur)
		Argentina-Uruguay bilateralism								Southern Common Market (Mercosur)
					Brazil-Uruguay bilateralism					Southern Common Market (Mercosur)
							Argentina-Brazil-Uruguay trilateralism			Southern Common Market (Mercosur)

== Geography ==
The territory of Mercosur consists of the combined territories of six of the 12 countries of South America and their population. Including the overseas territories of member states, Mercosur experiences most types of climate from Antarctic to tropical, rendering meteorological averages for Mercosur as a whole meaningless. The majority of the population lives in areas with a subtropical climate (Uruguay, Southern Paraguay, Northeastern and Center Argentina and Southern and Southeastern Brazil), or a tropical climate (Venezuela and Northeastern Brazil). The Mercosur member states are home to the world's highest uninterrupted waterfall, Angel Falls in Venezuela; the largest river by volume, the Amazon River in Brazil; the longest mountain range, the Andes (whose highest mountain is Aconcagua at 6,962 m or 22,841 ft in Argentina); the largest rainforest, the Amazon rainforest in Brazil; and much more if we take the associated members into account, such as the highest capital city, La Paz, Bolivia; the highest commercially navigable lake in the world, Lake Titicaca in Peru; the driest non-polar place on earth, the Atacama Desert; and, excluding research stations in Antarctica, the world's southernmost permanently inhabited community, Puerto Toro, Chile.

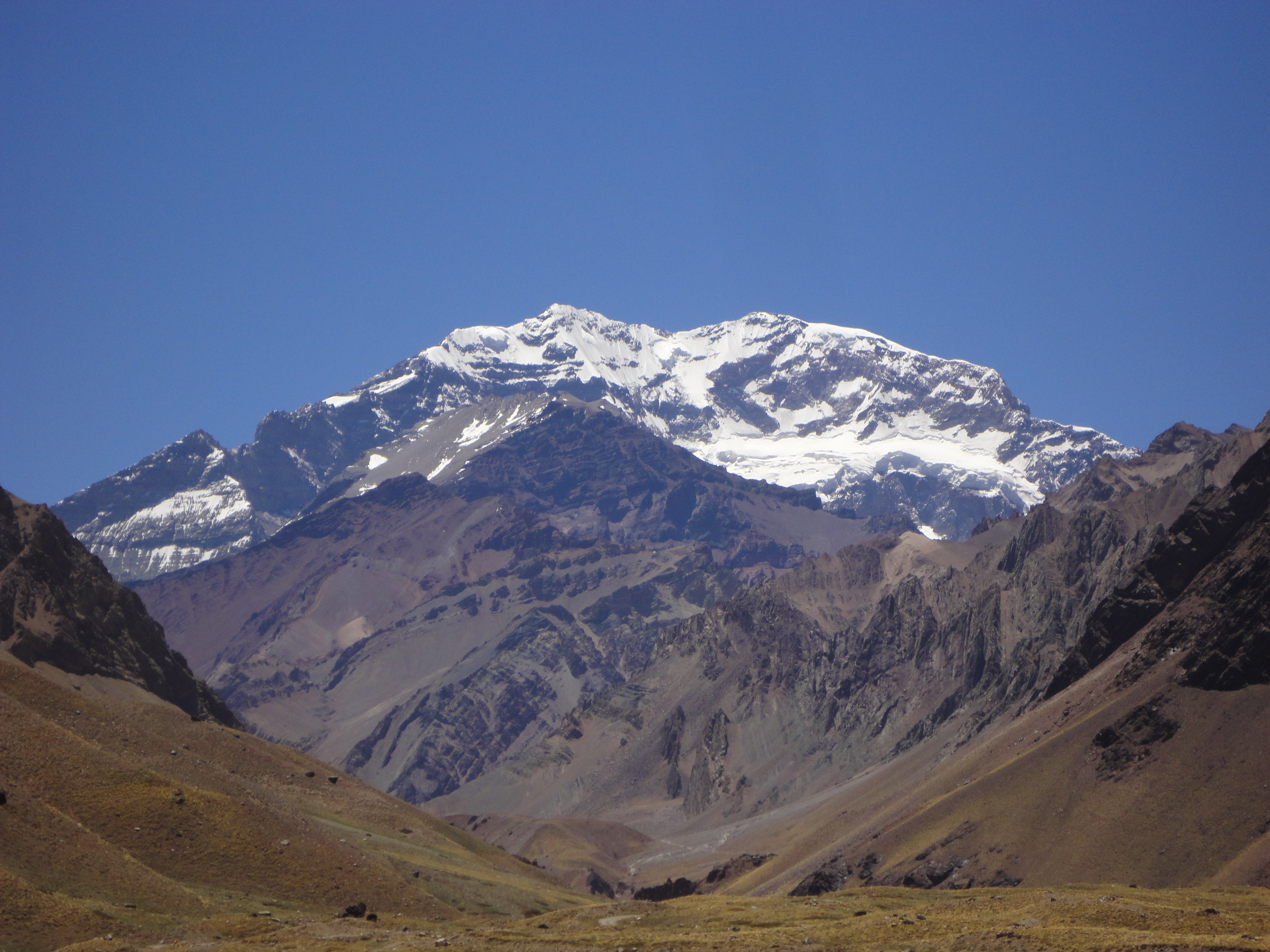
Mount Aconcagua in Argentina

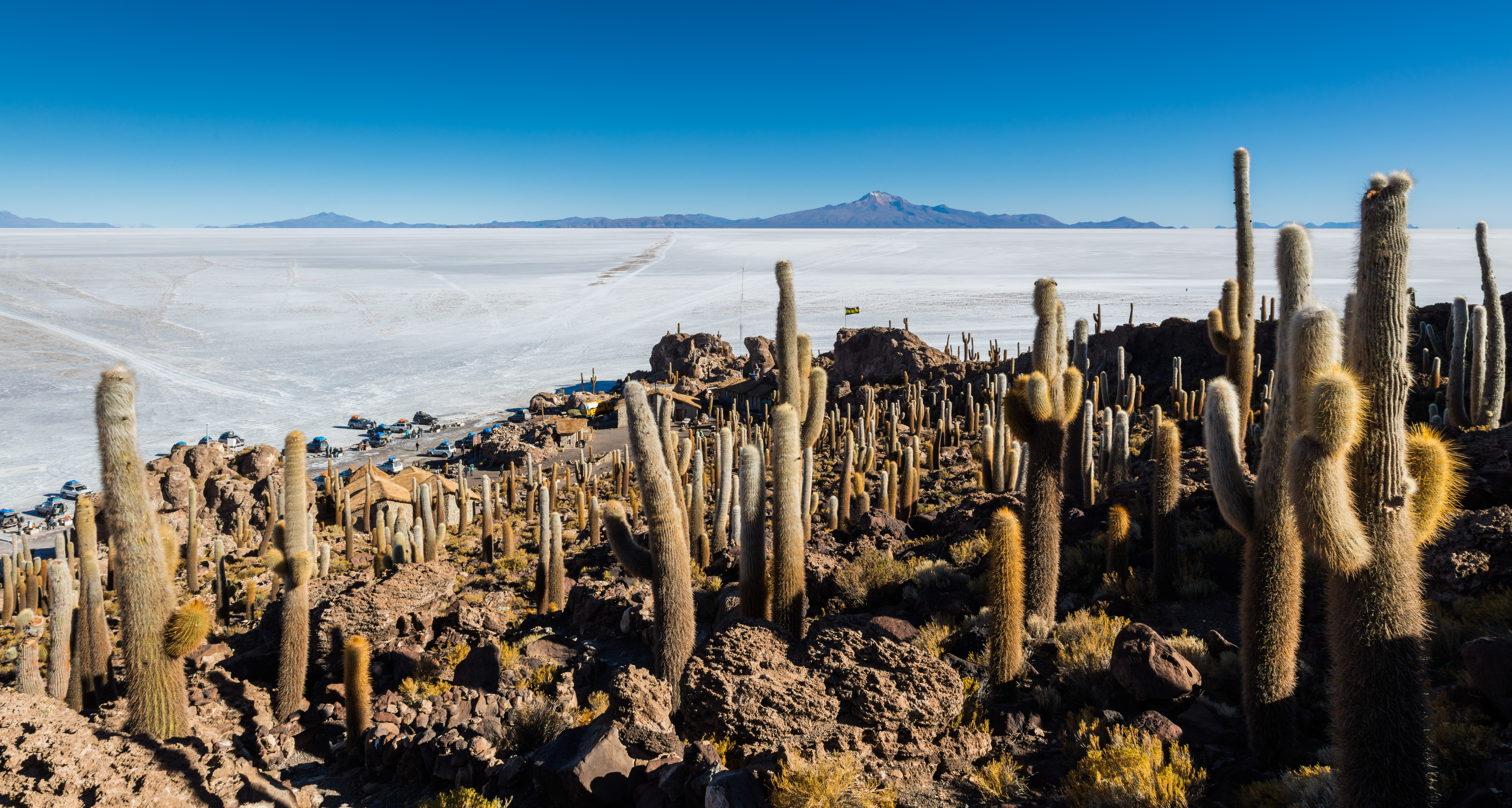
Uyuni salt flats in Bolivia

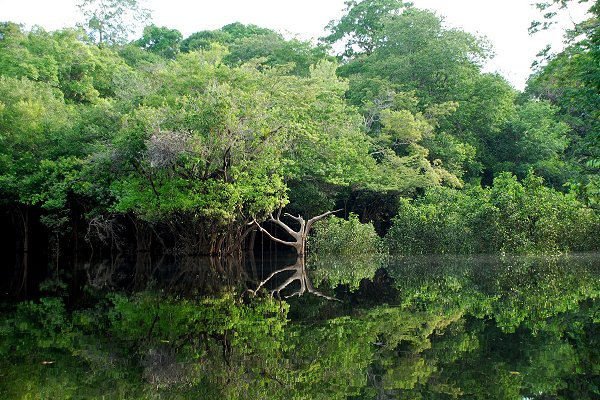
The Amazon rainforest in Brazil

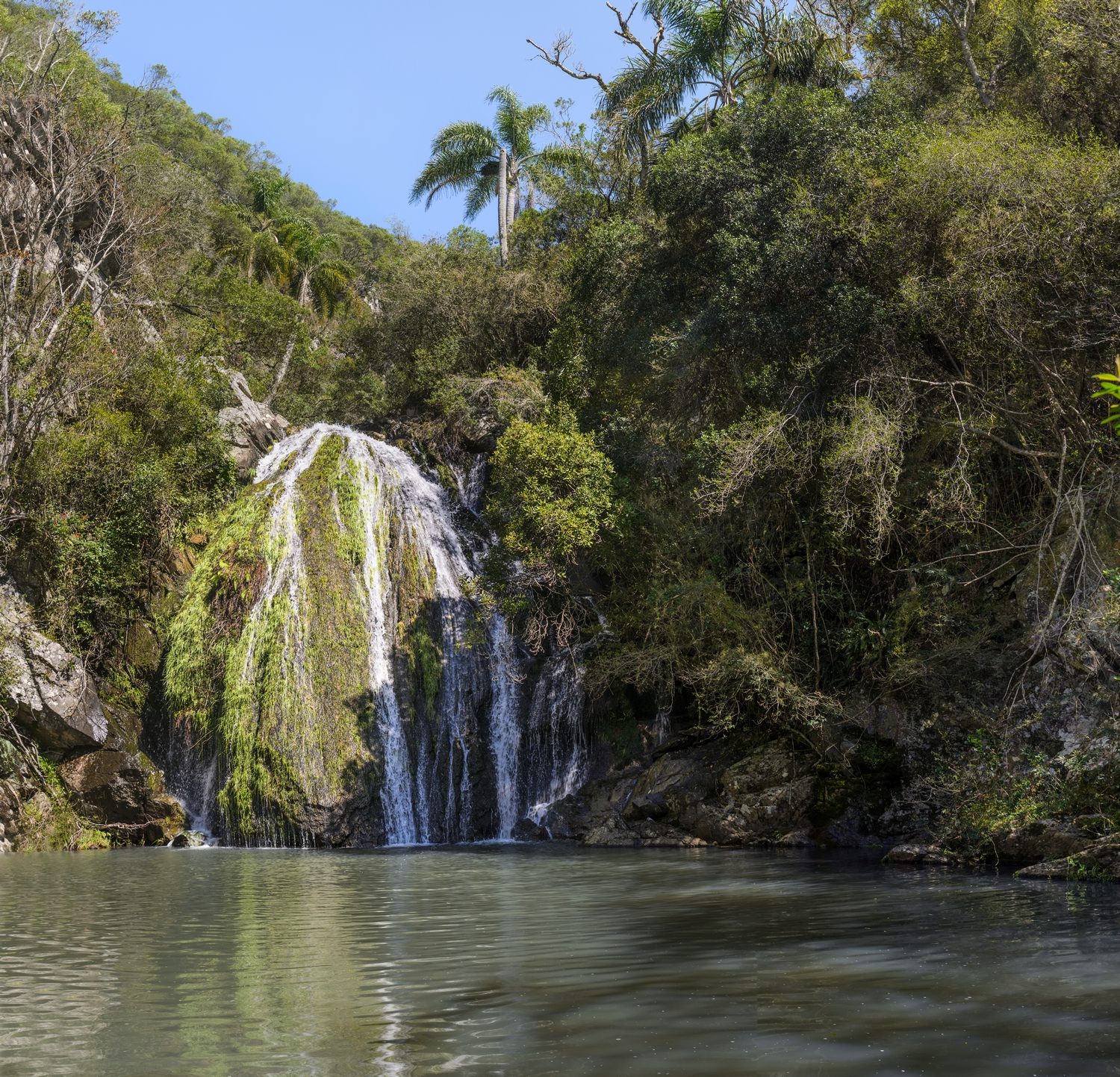
Sierra de las Ánimas in Uruguay

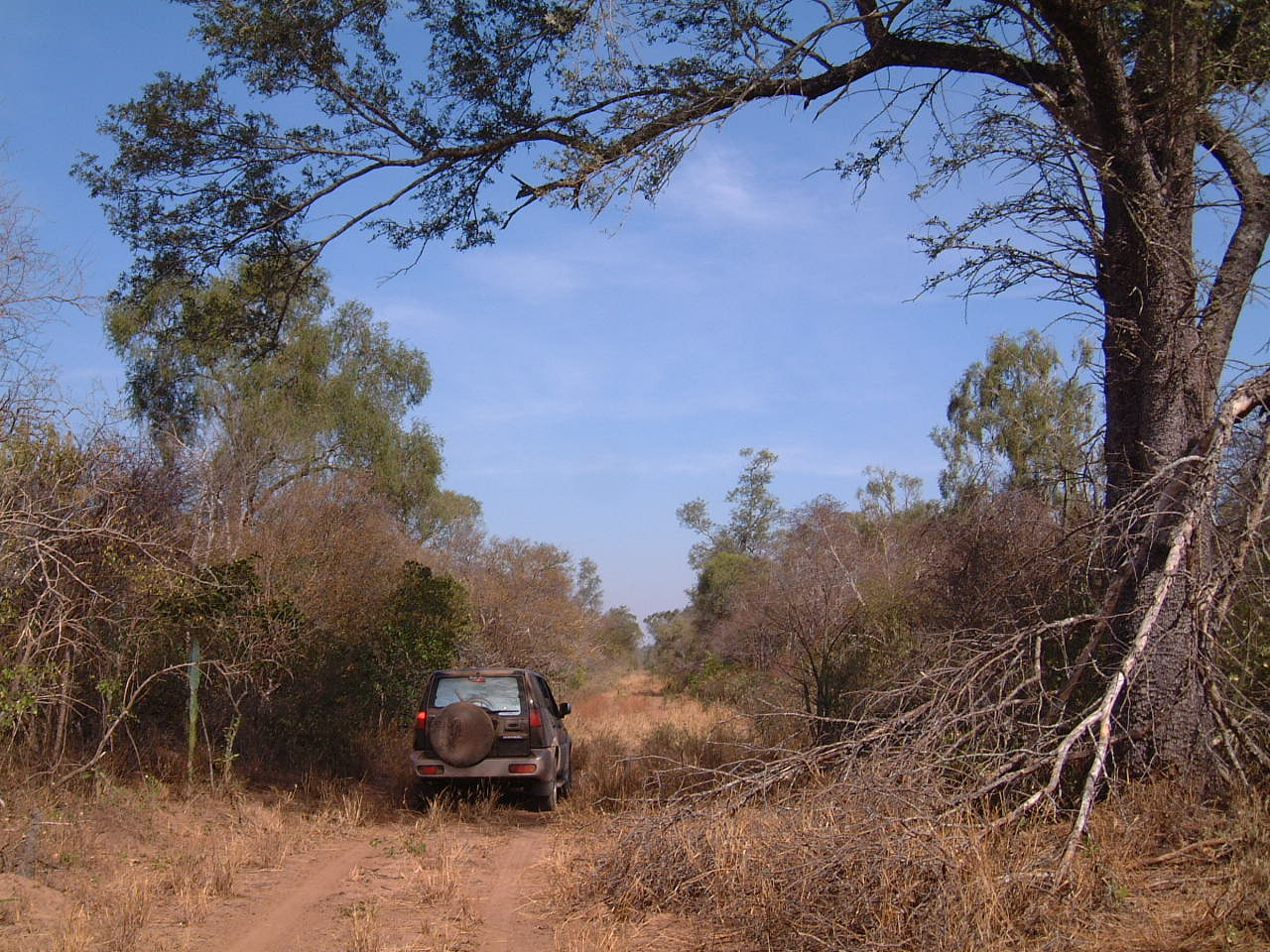
Gran Chaco in Paraguay

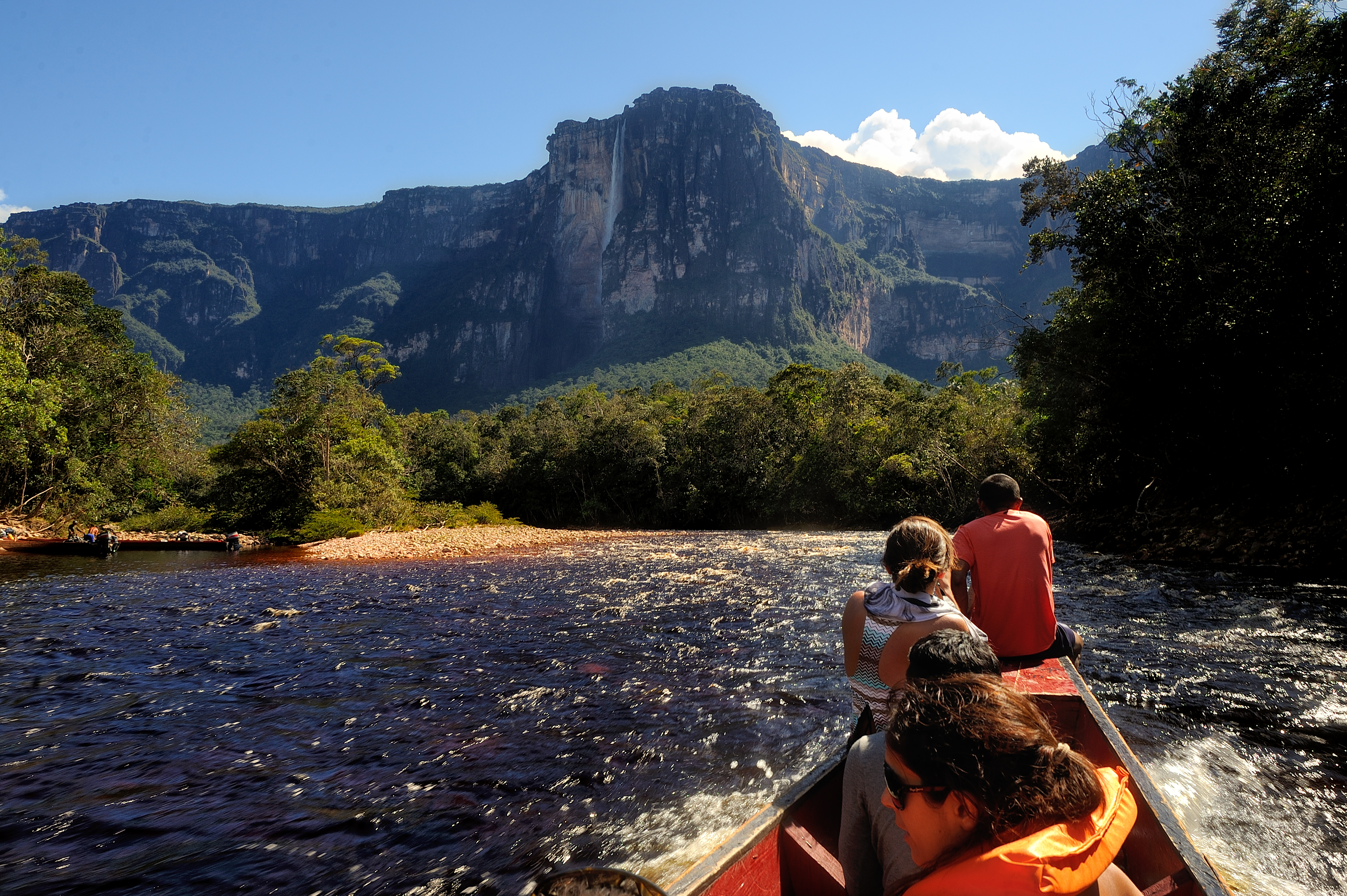
The Angel falls in Venezuela

One Mercosur full member, Argentina, has a claim to Antarctica called Argentine Antarctica (part of the province of Tierra del Fuego) which partially overlaps with the claim of Mercosur-associated state Chile, namely Chilean Antarctica. Brazil does not formally claim any part of Antarctic territory, but has a "zone of interest" called Brazilian Antarctica which overlaps Argentina's claim.

== Member states ==
Mercosur is composed of six sovereign member states: Argentina, Bolivia, Brazil, Paraguay, Uruguay and Venezuela (suspended since December 2016); seven associated states: Suriname, Guyana, Colombia, Ecuador, Panama, Peru and Chile. Following the impeachment of Fernando Lugo by the Paraguayan Senate, Paraguay was suspended from Mercosur. Shortly afterwards, Venezuela was admitted as a full member on 31 July 2012. Venezuela had four years to fully adapt to the trade bloc regulations and failed to do so, with the nation being suspended from Mercosur on 1 December 2016. Bolivia became a newest full member state on 8 July 2024.

=== Member states ===
Arms	Flag	State	Capital	Area	Population (2021)	Population density	HDI (2023)	Accession
	Flag of Argentina	Argentina	Buenos Aires	2,766,890 km^{2} (1,068,300 sq mi)	45,276,780	16.03/km^{2} (41.5/sq mi)	0.865	26 March 1991
	Flag of Bolivia	Bolivia	La Paz, Sucre (Note: La Paz is the administrative capital of Bolivia; Sucre is the judicial seat and legal capital as stated in the constitution.)	1,098,580 km^{2} (424,160 sq mi)	12,079,472	10.3/km^{2} (27/sq mi)	0.733	8 July 2024
	Flag of Brazil	Brazil	Brasília	8,514,877 km^{2} (3,287,612 sq mi)	214,326,223	24.6/km^{2} (64/sq mi)	0.786	26 March 1991
	Flag of Paraguay	Paraguay	Asunción	406,750 km^{2} (157,050 sq mi)	6,703,799	17.1/km^{2} (44/sq mi)	0.756	26 March 1991
	Flag of Uruguay	Uruguay	Montevideo	176,220 km^{2} (68,040 sq mi)	3,426,260	19.57/km^{2} (50.7/sq mi)	0.862	26 March 1991
	Flag of Venezuela	Venezuela (suspended) (Note: Associate state (2004), Protocol of Accession (2006), full membership (2012), suspended (1 December 2016).)	Caracas	916,445 km^{2} (353,841 sq mi)	28,199,867	31.52/km^{2} (81.6/sq mi)	0.709	31 July 2012
Total				12,963,317 km^{2} (5,005,165 sq mi)	281,812,534	21.74/km^{2} (56.3/sq mi)	0.785	

=== Associated states ===
Arms	Flag	State	Capital	Area	Population (2021)	Population density	HDI (2024)	Accession
	Flag of Chile	Chile	Santiago	756,950 km^{2} (292,260 sq mi)	19,493,184	24.74/km^{2} (64.1/sq mi)	0.878	25 June 1996
	Flag of Colombia	Colombia	Bogotá	1,141,748 km^{2} (440,831 sq mi)	51,516,562	43.49/km^{2} (112.6/sq mi)	0.788	17 December 2004
	Flag of Ecuador	Ecuador	Quito	283,560 km^{2} (109,480 sq mi)	17,797,737	60.24/km^{2} (156.0/sq mi)	0.777	16 December 2004
	Flag of Guyana	Guyana	Georgetown	214,999 km^{2} (83,012 sq mi)	804,567	3.62/km^{2} (9.4/sq mi)	0.776	12 July 2013
	Flag of Panama	Panama	Panama City	75,417 km^{2} (29,119 sq mi)	4,351,267	56/km^{2} (150/sq mi)	0.839	7 December 2024
	Flag of Peru	Peru	Lima	1,285,220 km^{2} (496,230 sq mi)	33,715,471	24.89/km^{2} (64.5/sq mi)	0.794	17 December 2003
	Flag of Suriname	Suriname	Paramaribo	163,270 km^{2} (63,040 sq mi)	612,985	3.52/km^{2} (9.1/sq mi)	0.722	12 July 2013

Directly subordinated to the Common Market Group, the work subgroups draw up the minutes of the decisions to submit for the consideration of the council, and study specific Mercosur concerns. The work subgroups are:

- Commercial matters
- Customs matters
- Technical standards
- Tax and monetary policies relating to trade
- Land transport
- Sea transport
- Industrial and technology policies
- Agricultural policy
- Energy policy
- Coordination of macroeconomic policies
- Labor, employment and social security matters

Work subgroups are held quarterly, alternating in every member state, in alphabetical order, or at the Common Market Group Administrative Office. Activities are carried out by the Work Subgroups in two stages: preparatory and conclusive. In the preparatory stage, members of the Work Subgroups may request the participation of representatives from the private sector of each member state. The decision-making stage is reserved exclusively for official representatives of the member states. The delegations of representatives from the private sector in the preparatory stage of the Work Subgroup activities will have a maximum of three representatives for each member state directly involved in any of the stages of the production, distribution or consumption process for the products that fall within the scope of the subgroup's activities.,

== Demographics ==
=== Population ===
Mercosur has a population of 284 million among its full member states. The region has several areas of sparse demographics such as tropical forests and deserts, but it is also highly urbanized with the presence of two alpha cities – São Paulo and Buenos Aires – and several beta cities such as Montevideo, Rio de Janeiro, Brasília, etc. The population is diverse, comprising people of European, Africans and Indigenous descent. People of Afro-Latin American descent tend to be concentrated in Brazil and Uruguay, with a smaller, but historic Afro-Argentine community in Argentina and an emerging population in Chile, the latter largely of Haitian origin. There is a high percentage of mestizos that vary greatly in composition by place. There is also a smaller population of Asians, notably in Brazil. The white population forms a majority in Argentina and Uruguay and represents about 45 percent in Brazil. Mestizos form the majority population in Paraguay, making it distinct from its immediate neighbors. Almost all Mercosur nations have significant indigenous American populations, especially in Paraguay (Guaraní is a national language in the country along with Spanish, and almost all Paraguayans have Guaraní genetic ancestry), Argentina (especially in the Northwest and Southwest of the country), Brazil (in the Northern and Northwest Amazonian states of the nation, where Native American tribes have vast reservation lands).

=== Urbanization ===
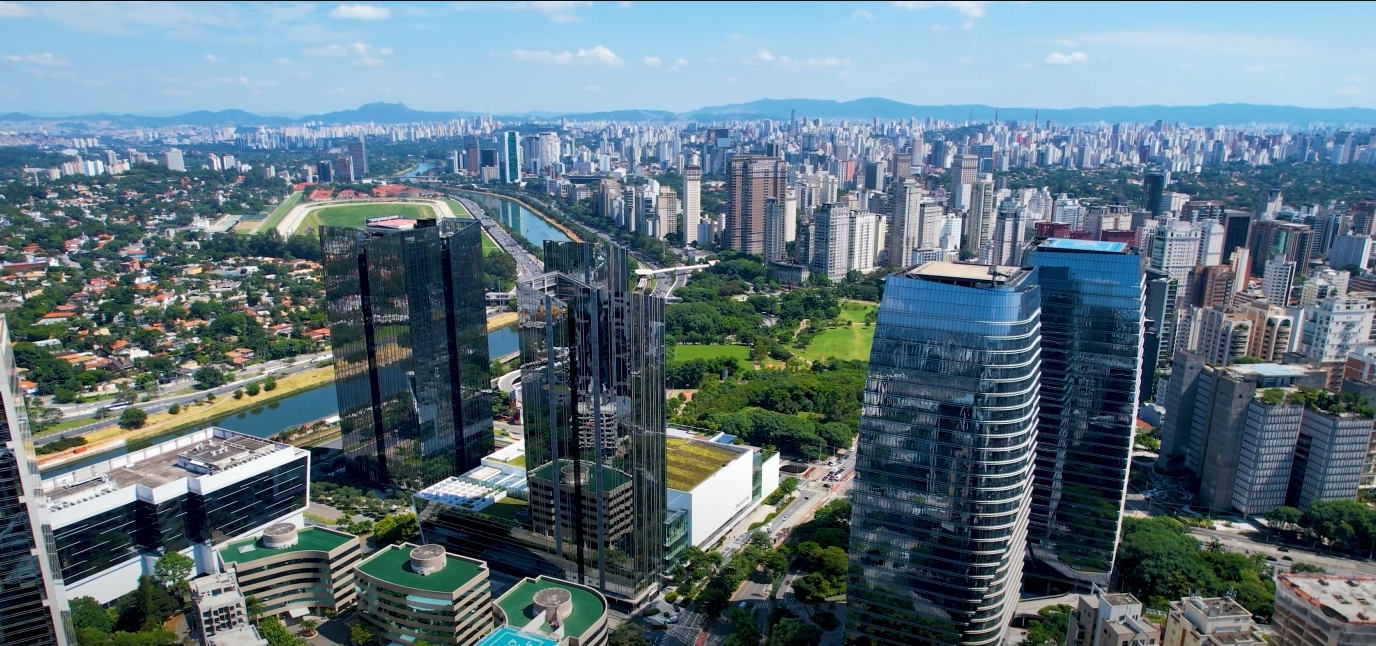
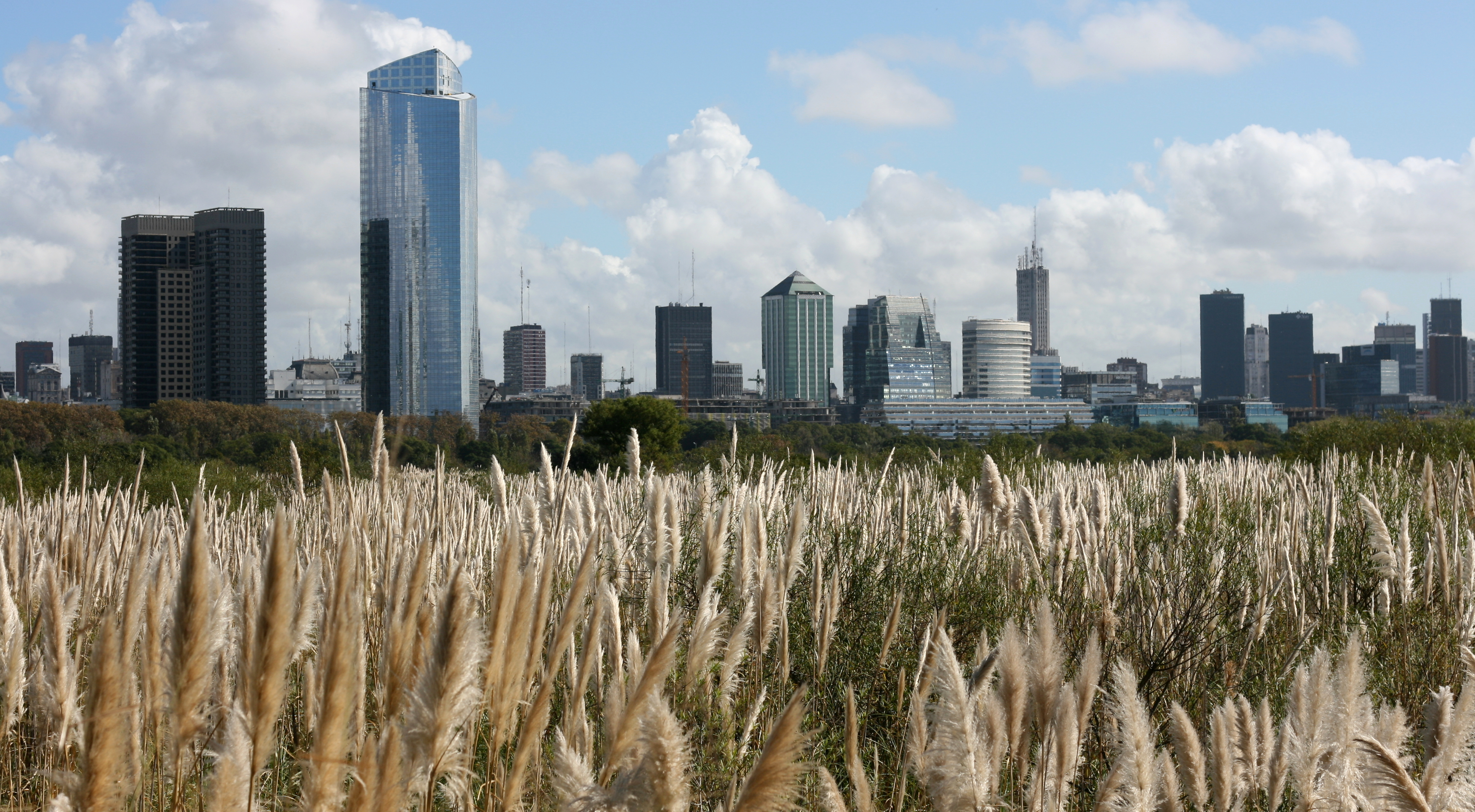
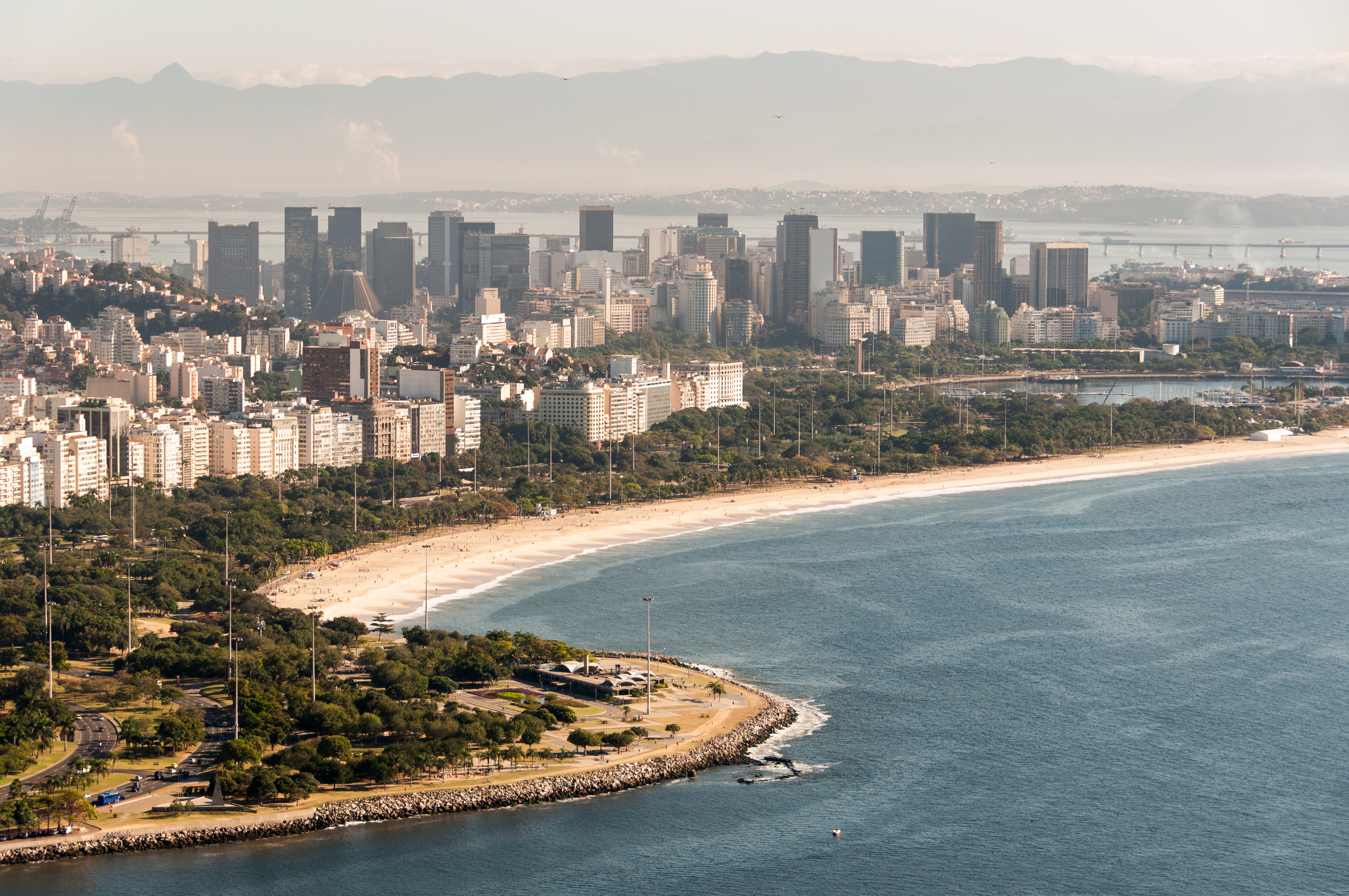
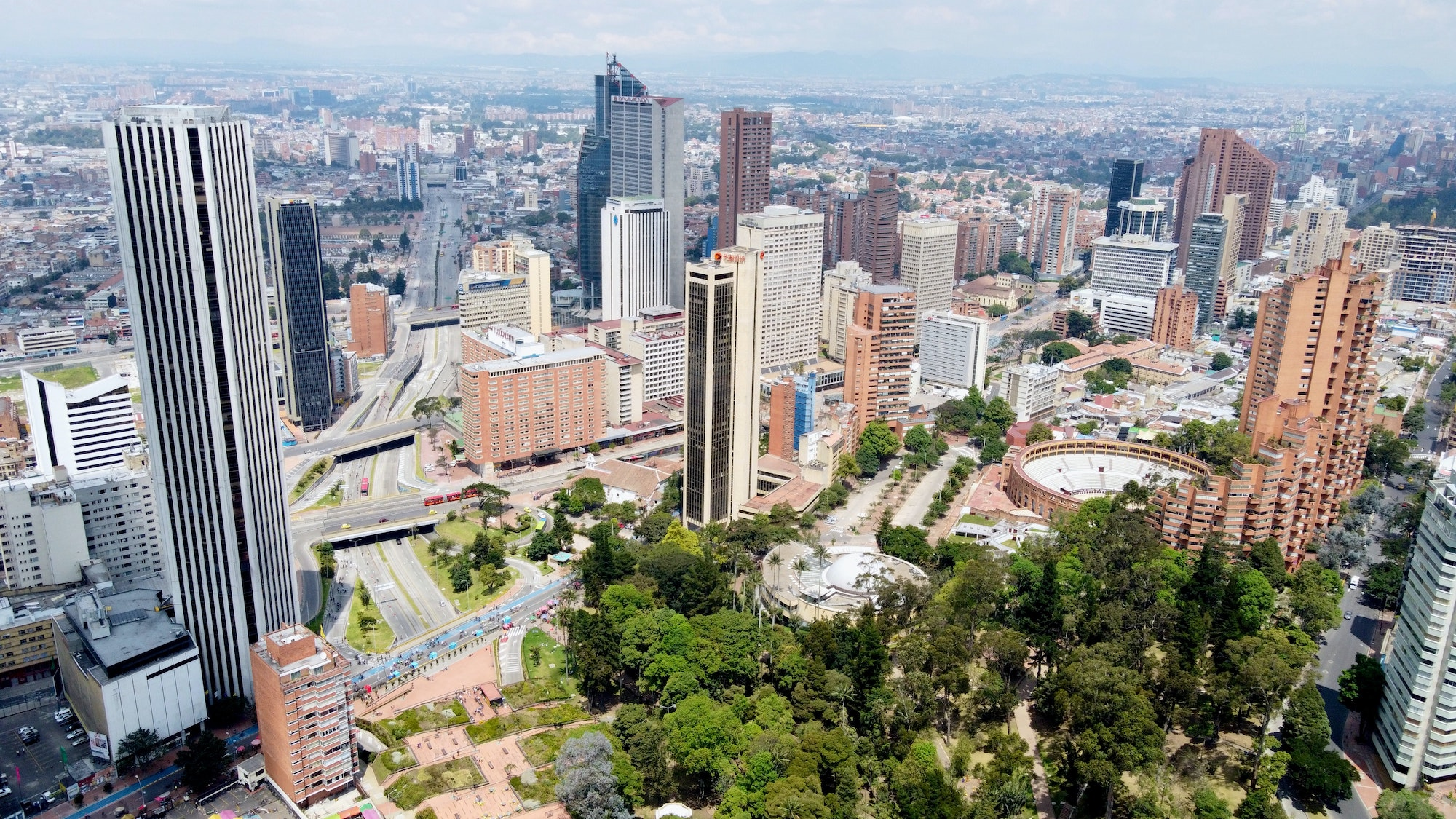
Largest population centres of South America by metropolitan area
	Rank	City name	Member state	Pop.	Rank	City name	Member state	Pop.
São Paulo Buenos Aires	1	São Paulo	Brazil	21,090,792	11	Fortaleza	Brazil	3,985,297	Rio de Janeiro Bogotá
São Paulo Buenos Aires	2	Buenos Aires	Argentina	13,693,657	12	Salvador	Brazil	3,953,290	Rio de Janeiro Bogotá
São Paulo Buenos Aires	3	Rio de Janeiro	Brazil	13,131,431	13	Recife	Brazil	3,914,397	Rio de Janeiro Bogotá
São Paulo Buenos Aires	4	Bogotá	Colombia	10,777,931	14	Medellín	Colombia	3,777,009	Rio de Janeiro Bogotá
São Paulo Buenos Aires	5	Lima	Peru	9,904,727	15	Curitiba	Brazil	3,502,804	Rio de Janeiro Bogotá
São Paulo Buenos Aires	6	Santiago	Chile	6,683,852	16	Campinas	Brazil	3,094,181	Rio de Janeiro Bogotá
São Paulo Buenos Aires	7	Belo Horizonte	Brazil	5,829,923	17	Guayaquil	Ecuador	2,952,159	Rio de Janeiro Bogotá
São Paulo Buenos Aires	8	Caracas	Venezuela	5,322,310	18	Cali	Colombia	2,911,278	Rio de Janeiro Bogotá
São Paulo Buenos Aires	9	Porto Alegre	Brazil	4,258,926	19	Quito	Ecuador	2,653,330	Rio de Janeiro Bogotá
São Paulo Buenos Aires	10	Brasília	Brazil	4,201,737	20	Maracaibo	Venezuela	2,576,836	Rio de Janeiro Bogotá

=== Languages ===
Language	Native speakers	Official in countries
Portuguese	71%	1
Spanish	26%	4
Guarani	3%	1

According to an article in the New York Times, Portuguese, Spanish and Guarani are the three official languages of the Mercosur, as they are the official languages of the five full members – Portuguese is the official language of Brazil, Spanish is the official language of all other full member countries, and Guarani is the co-official language of Paraguay and Argentina's province of Corrientes. Guarani is the most commonly spoken language in Paraguay. However, the official languages of its constituent states are not necessarily the official languages of the Mercosur organisation itself, which only recognizes Portuguese and Spanish as working languages, and Guarani only as a recognised language.

That Guarani is an official language there has been described as a common fallacy. Mercosur does not provide all, or even most, services in Guaraní. The official website is in Spanish, Portuguese and English, and almost all official summits are only held in Spanish and Portuguese. Important documents, such as legislation, are translated into Portuguese and Spanish. Among the full members, Portuguese is the most spoken language, with over 214 million native speakers as of 2021, while Spanish accounts for 83 million speakers approximately. Even though language policy is the responsibility of member states, Mercosur institutions promote multilingualism among its citizens, and while Brazil has enforced Spanish as a foreign language to be taught at school, Argentina and Venezuela have done so with Portuguese.

== Merchandise trade ==
Intra-Mercosur merchandise trade (excluding Venezuela) grew from US$10 billion at the inception of the trade bloc in 1991, to US$88 billion in 2010; Brazil and Argentina each accounted for 43% of this total. The trade balance within the bloc has historically been tilted toward Brazil, which recorded an intra-Mercosur balance of over US$5 billion in 2010. Trade within Mercosur amounted to only 16% of the four countries' total merchandise trade in 2010, however; trade with the European Union (20%), China (14%), and the United States (11%) was of comparable importance. Exports from the bloc are highly diversified, and include a variety of agricultural, industrial, and energy goods. Merchandise trade with the rest of the world in 2010 resulted in a surplus for Mercosur of nearly US$7 billion; trade in services, however, was in deficit by over US$28 billion. The EU and China maintained a nearly balanced merchandise trade with Mercosur in 2010, while the United States reaped a surplus of over US$14 billion; Mercosur, in turn, earned significant surpluses (over US$4 billion each in 2010) in its trade with Chile and Venezuela. The latter became a full member in 2012.

Country	Population in 2018 (thousands)	GDP (nominal) in 2018 (USD millions)	GDP (nominal) per capita	GDP (PPP) in 2018 (USD millions)	GDP (PPP) per capita	Human Development Index score (2019)	Merchandise trade, 2011 ($ billions)		Trade with Mercosur (% of each, 2010)	
Country	Population in 2018 (thousands)	GDP (nominal) in 2018 (USD millions)	GDP (nominal) per capita	GDP (PPP) in 2018 (USD millions)	GDP (PPP) per capita	Human Development Index score (2019)	Exports	Imports	Exports	Imports
Argentina	44,570	518,092	14,400	920,248	20,787	0.845	84.3	73.9	25.2	33.6
Brazil	209,218	1,868,184	9,821	3,240,524	15,484	0.765	399.8	363.6	11.1	9.0
Paraguay	7,050	40,714	5,592	97,163	13,584	0.728	9.8	12.1	29.0	42.0
Uruguay	3,506	60,180	17,120	77,992	22,563	0.817	8.0	10.7	33.8	48.8
Total	264,347	3,396,213	11,887	5,404,156	19,569	0.788	501.9	460.3	24.77	33.35

=== Economic development ===
Internal trade in the Mercosur block has grown from $4 billion in 1990 to $41 billion in 2022.

== Structure ==
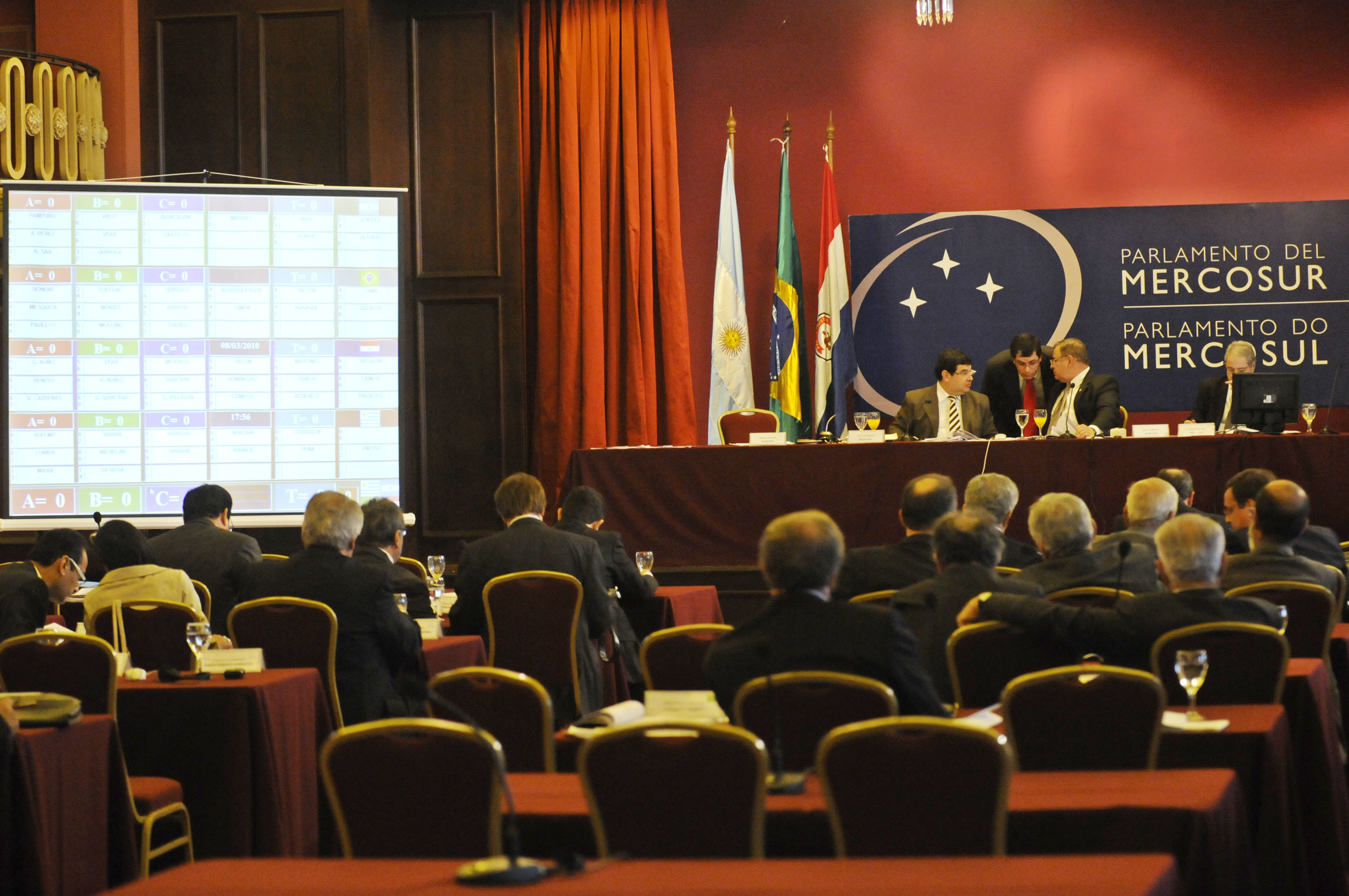
Mercosur Parliament

The Asunción Treaty and Ouro Preto Protocol established the basis for the institutional Mercosur structure, creating the Common Market Council and the Common Market Group, both of which function at the outset of the transition phase. As provided for in this Treaty, before establishing the common market the member nations must call a special meeting to determine the definitive institutional structure for the public agencies managing Mercosur, as well as define the specific functions of each agency and the decision-making process.

=== Common Market Council ===
The council is the highest-level agency of Mercosur with the authority to conduct its policy, and responsibility for compliance with the objects and time frames set forth in the Asuncion Treaty. The council is composed of the Ministers of Foreign Affairs and the Economy (or the equivalent) of all five countries. Member states preside over the Council in rotating alphabetical order, for six-month periods. Meetings: Council members shall meet whenever necessary, but at least once a year. The presidents of the member nations shall partake of the annual Common Market Council meeting whenever possible. Decision Making: Council decisions shall be made by consensus, with representation of all member states.

=== Common Market Group ===
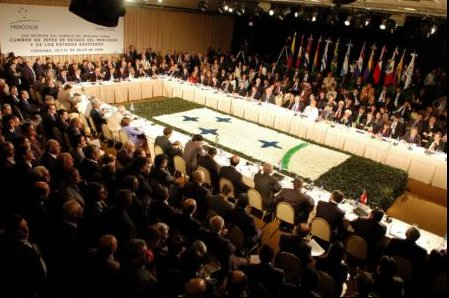
Mercosur reunion in Cordoba, 2006

The Group is the executive body of Mercosur, and is coordinated by the Ministries of Foreign Affairs of the member states. Its basic duties are to cause compliance with the Asuncion Treaty and to take resolutions required for implementation of the decisions made by the council. Furthermore, it can initiate practical measures for trade opening, coordination of macroeconomic policies, and negotiation of agreements with nonmember states and international agencies, participating when need be in resolution of controversies under Mercosur. It has the authority to organize, coordinate and supervise Work Subgroups and to call special meetings to deal with issues of interest. Composition: The Common Market Group shall be made up of four permanent members and four alternates from each member state, representing the following public agencies: (i) the Ministry of Foreign Affairs; (ii) the Ministry of Economy, or the equivalent (from industry, foreign affairs and/or economic coordination); and (iii) the Central Bank. The members of the Common Market Group appointed by a given member state will constitute the National Section of the Common Market Group for that particular nation. Meetings: The Common Market Group will meet ordinarily at least once every quarter in the member states, in rotating alphabetical order. Special meetings may be freely called at any time, at any previously scheduled place. The meetings will be coordinated by the Head of the Delegation of the host member state. Decision Making: Common Market Group decisions shall be made by consensus, with the representation of all member states. The official Mercosur languages will be Portuguese and Spanish, and the official version of all work papers will be prepared in the language of the country hosting the meeting.

=== Administrative and socioeconomic ===
The Administrative Office will keep documents and issue the Mercosur official bulletin in both Portuguese and Spanish, and will also be charged with communicating the activities of the Common Market Group so as to allow for the maximum disclosure of decisions and the relevant documentation. The Socioeconomic Advisory Forum is consultative by nature, and represents the various socioeconomic sectors of the member nations.

=== Work subgroups ===
Directly subordinated to the Common Market Group, the Work Subgroups draw up the minutes of the decisions to submit for the consideration of the council, and conduct studies on specific Mercosur concerns. The work subgroups are the following: commercial matters; customs matters; technical standards; tax and monetary policies relating to trade; land transport; sea transport; industrial and technology policies; agricultural policy; energy policy; coordination of macroeconomic policies; and labor, employment and social security matters. The meetings of the Work subgroups will be held quarterly, alternating in every member state, in alphabetical order, or at the Common Market Group Administrative Office. Activities will be carried out by the Work Subgroups in two stages: preparatory and conclusive. In the preparatory stage, the members of the Work Subgroups may request the participation of representatives from the private sector of each member state. The decision-making stage is reserved exclusively for official representatives of the member states. The delegations of representatives from the private sector in the preparatory stage of the Work Subgroup activities will have a maximum of three representatives for each member state directly involved in any of the stages of the production, distribution or consumption process for the products that fall within the scope of the subgroup's activities.

=== Joint Parliamentary Committee ===
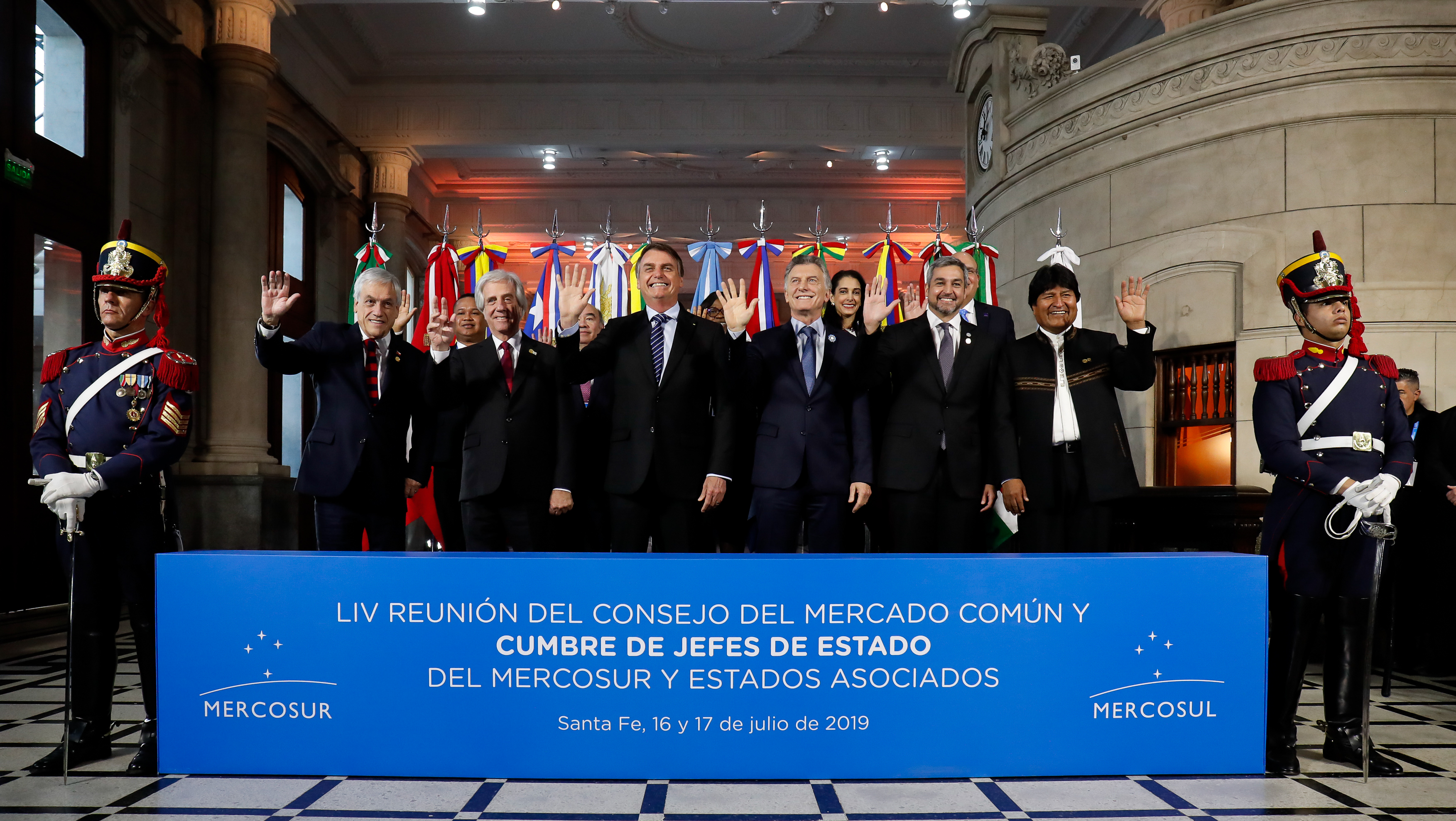
Presidents of Mercosur at 2019 summit, Santa Fe, Argentina

The Committee will have both an advisory and decision-making nature; with powers to submit proposals as well. It will be competent, inter alia, to: follow up on the integration process and keep the respective Congresses informed; Take the necessary steps for the future instatement of a Mercosur Parliament; Organize subcommittees to examine matters relating to the integration process; Submit its recommendations to the Common Market Council and Group as to how the integration process should be conducted and Southern Common Market formed; Make the adjustments necessary to harmonize the laws of the different member states and submit them to the respective Congresses; Establish relationships with private entities in each of the member states, as well as international agencies and bureaus so as to obtain information and specialized assistance with matters of interest; Establish relationships targeting cooperation with Congresses of the nonmember nations and entities involved in regional integration schemes; Subscribe to cooperation and technical assistance accords with public and/or private entities whether domestic, supranational or international. The committee will be composed of a maximum of 64 acting parliamentary members, 16 per member state, and an equal number of alternates, appointed by the Congress to which they pertain, and with a term of office of at least two years. The meetings shall be conducted by a directors' board consisting of four presidents (one for each member state). The committee will ordinarily meet twice a year, and extraordinarily whenever summoned by any of its five presidents. Meetings are held in the territory of each member state on a successive and alternating basis. Decision Making: Meetings of the Joint Parliamentary Committee will only be valid when attended by parliamentary delegations from all member states. Decisions by the Joint Parliamentary Committee will be made by consensus vote of the majority of the members accredited by the respective Congresses of each member state. Portuguese and Spanish are the official languages of the Joint Parliamentary Committee.

=== Trade Commission ===
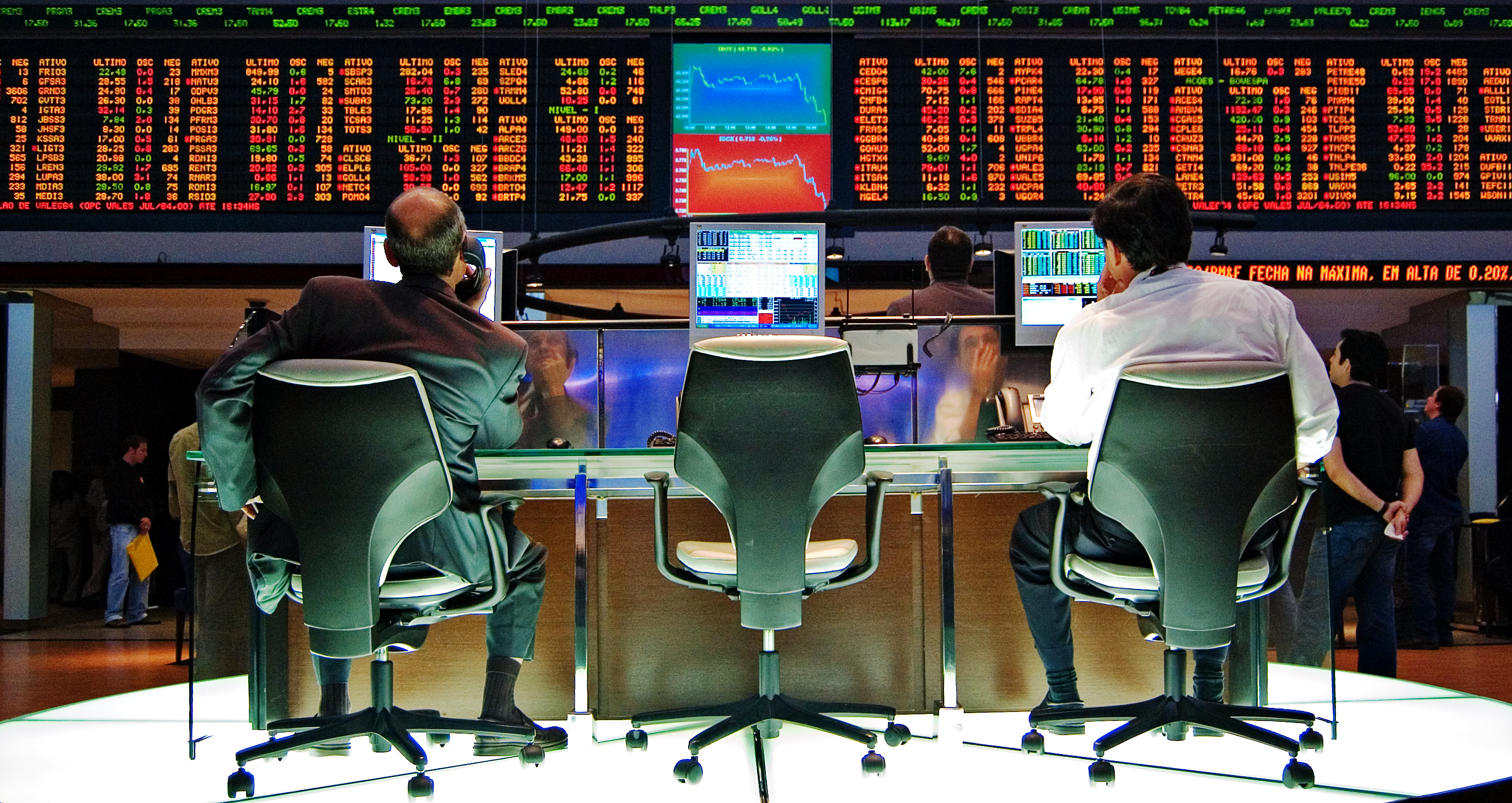
São Paulo Stock Exchange, the largest of Latin America

The Trade Commission will assist the Mercosur executive body, always striving to apply the instruments of common trade policy agreed to by the member states for operation of the customs unification. The commission should also follow up on the development of issues and matters related to common trade policies, the intra-Mercosur trade and trade with other countries. The commission will have five actual members and four alternates, with each member nation's indicating a member. The Trade Commission shall exert every effort to apply common trade policy instruments such as: trade agreements with other countries or international entities; administrative/commercial product lists; final adaptation system for Mercosur customs unification; origin system; free-trade zone system, special customs areas and export processing zones; system to discourage unfair trade practices; elimination and harmonization of tariff restrictions; nonmember country safeguard systems; customs coordination and harmonization; consumer protection systems; and export incentive harmonization.

Furthermore, the trade commission should speak out regarding the issues raised by the member states regarding application and compliance with common offshore tariffs and other common trade policy instruments. The commission shall meet at least once a month, as well as whenever asked to by the Mercosur executive agency or by a member state. The commission can take decisions entailing administration and application of trade policies adopted under Southern Common Market, and whenever necessary submit proposals to the executive body regarding regulation of the areas under its authority; additionally, it can propose new guidelines or modify those in existence in Mercosur trade and customs matters. In this respect, the trade commission can propose a change in the import duty on specific items under common external tariffs, including cases referring to development of new Mercosur production activities. To better achieve its objectives, the trade commission can create technical committees targeting direction and supervision of the work it engages in. It can also adopt internal operating regulations. Proposals and decisions of the trade commission will be taken by a consensus of the representatives indicated by each member nation. Any disputes ensuing from the application, interpretation or compliance with the acts issued by the trade commission are referred to the Mercosur executive body, and should be resolved using the directives set forth in the Dispute Resolution System adopted under Southern Common Market.

== International jurisdiction over contractual matters ==
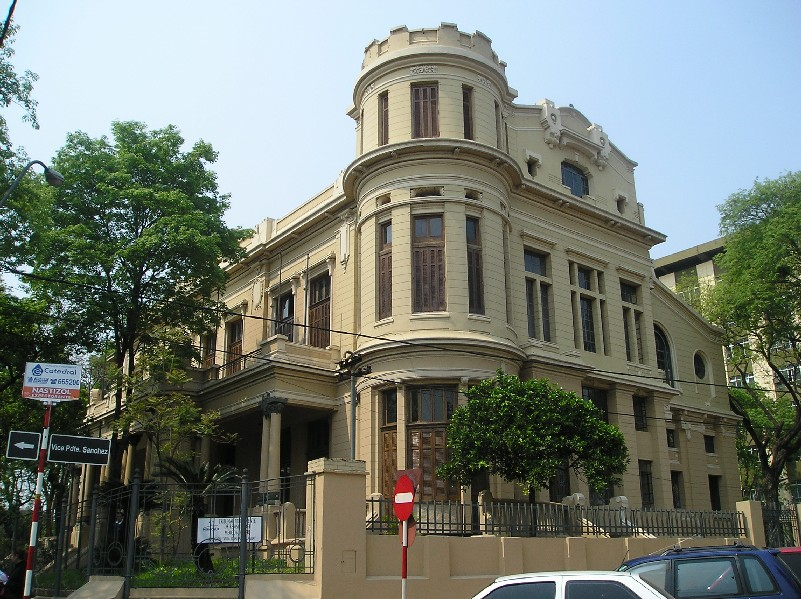
Court of Mercosur, in the city of Asunción, Paraguay

The rules on litigation jurisdiction over contractual matters will apply to disputes arising from civil or commercial international contracts between private-law legal entities or individuals provided that: They are domiciled or headquartered in different member states: At least one of the parties to the contract is domiciled or headquartered in any member state and, additionally, has made a choice of jurisdiction in favor of a court in one of the member states. In this case, there must be a reasonable connection between the jurisdiction chosen and the controversy. The scope of the application of the international jurisdiction guidelines over contractual matters excludes the following: legal relationships between bankrupt entities/individuals and their creditors and any other analogous proceedings (especially concordatas composition with creditors); matters under agreements involving family and succession law; social security contracts; administrative contracts; employment contracts; consumer sales contracts; transport contracts; insurance policies; and rights in rem.

=== Choice of jurisdiction ===
Courts in member nations to whose jurisdiction the contracted parties have agreed to submit the matter in writing will have jurisdiction to settle controversies stemming from civil or commercial international contracts.

=== Agreement of choice ===
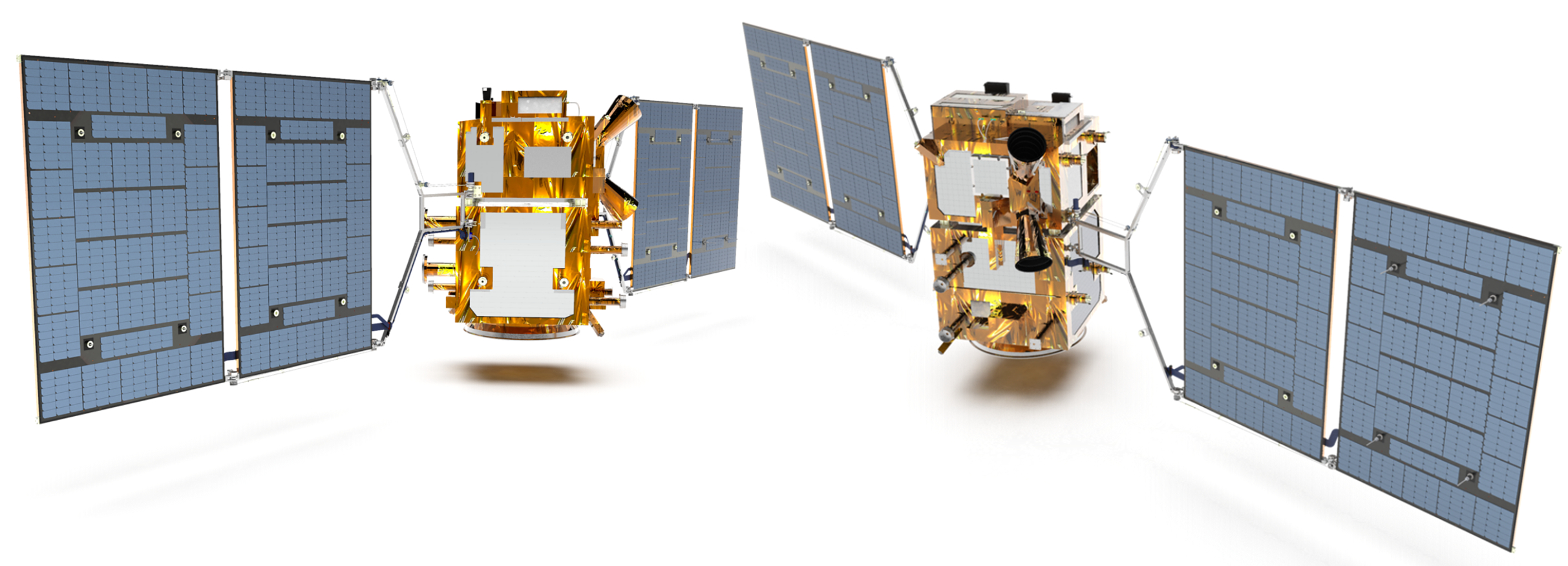
The SABIA-Mar, scheduled to launch in 2023, is a Brazilian/Argentine Earth observation satellite.

The jurisdiction can be agreed on at the time the contract is signed, during the life of the contract, or even when the dispute actually arises. The validity and effects of the choice of venue will be governed by the law of the member nations that normally have jurisdiction to hear the case, always resorting to the law most favorable to the validity of the contract. Whether or not jurisdiction is chosen, such jurisdiction will be prorogated in favor of the courts of the member state where the proceedings are in fact filed, provided the respondent voluntarily allows this in an affirmative and unfeigned way.

=== Subsidiary jurisdiction ===
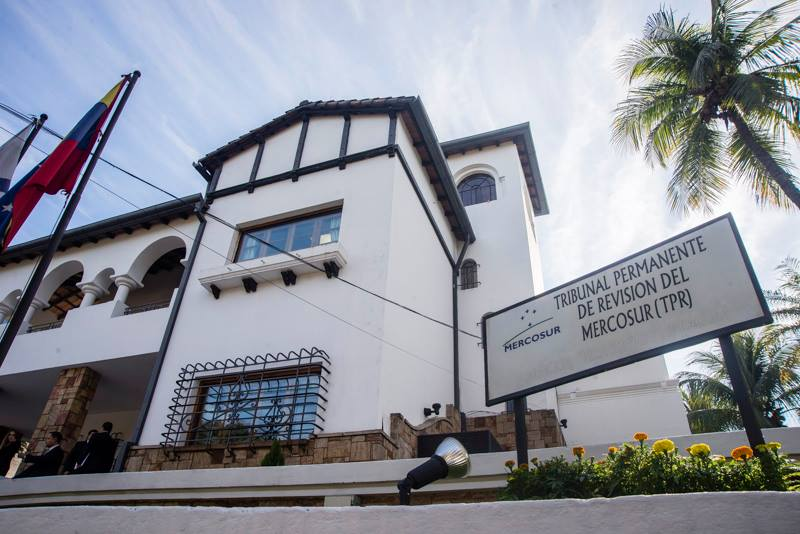
Mercosur Permanent Tribunal of Revision

Should the contracted parties not agree on courts competent to settle disputes, the member state chosen by the plaintiff of the case has jurisdiction—the court of the place where the contract is to be performed, the court of the domicile of the respondent, or the court of the domicile, or headquarters of the claimant when the latter can show that it has done its part. For purposes of item (i) above the place of performance of the contract is the member state where the obligations on which the claim is based have been or should be performed, taking into consideration the following: For contracts involving certain specific items, the place where they existed at the time of contract signing; For contracts involving specific items according to their type, the place of domicile of the debtor at the time of contract signing; For contracts involving fungible items, the place of domicile of the debtor at the time of conclusion of the contract; and For service rendering contracts:

- If in regard to items, this the place where they were at the time of contract signing.
- If effectiveness is related to any special place, this is the place where they were to produce effects.
- In all other cases, this is the place of domicile of the debtor at the time of contract signing. For purposes of application of second item above for determination of the domicile of the respondent in a contractual dispute involving individuals, the following will be taken into consideration: The habitual residence: On a subsidiary basis, the central place of business; and In the absence of any such considerations, the place where found, meaning the actual residence. When dealing with a legal entity, the determination of the domicile will be based on where the administrative headquarters have been set up. The claim plaintiff can, as an alternative, file in any of the places where the legal entity has branches, establishments, agencies or any other type of representation. Legal entities headquartered in any member state that have concluded contracts with any other member state can be sued in the courts of the latter state should there be any dispute as to the construction and implementation of the obligations regulated by contract. In the event there is a codefendant, a suit on contractual matters can be adjudicated with the courts of jurisdiction in the territory of the domicile of any of the parties to the litigation. Additionally, any claims entailing personal collateral rights or intervention of nonmember states in contractual obligations can be filed with the court hearing the main proceeding.

=== Counterclaims ===
In the event of there being a counterclaim based on any act or fact that served as the basis for the main proceeding, the courts hearing the main proceeding will be competent to hear any counterclaims that may arise.

== Educational integration ==
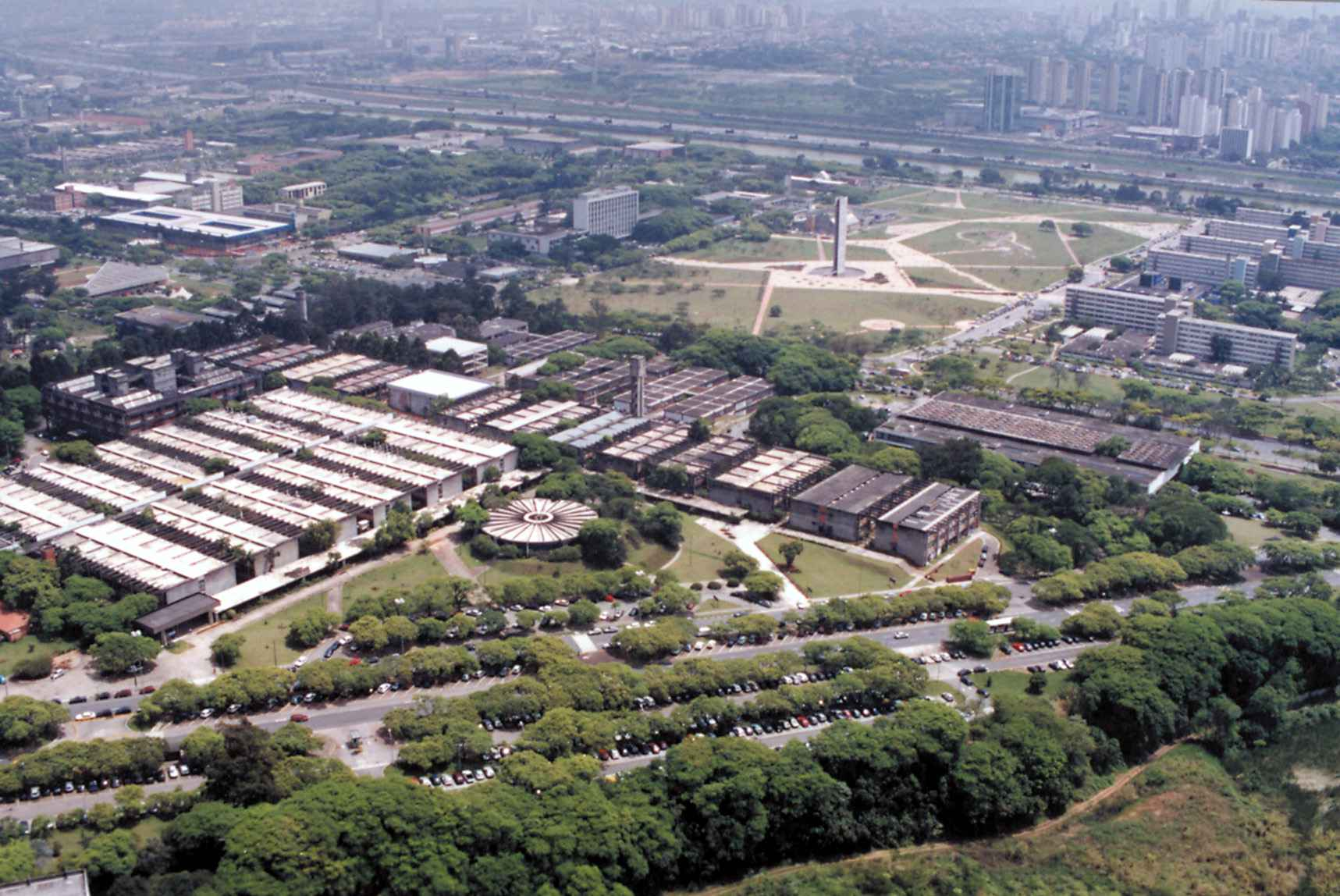
The University of São Paulo, in São Paulo, Brazil, is one of the most highly esteemed university institutions in the region of Mercosur.

Based on the premise that education is a fundamental factor in the regional integration process, educational courses at the primary or junior high level, provided that they do not entail technical studies, will be recognized by member states as being on the same level for all member nations. Likewise, to facilitate continuing education, course certificates issued by an institution accredited in one of the member states is valid in all other member states. Nontechnical primary and junior high level studies that have not been completed are accredited by any member state, thereby allowing course conclusion in another member nation. Studies are completed using an equivalency table to determine the level achieved.

=== Regional technical commission ===
A regional technical commission harmonizes mechanisms for accreditation across member nations, and resolves any situation not be covered by the equivalency table. This commission includes delegations from the ministries of education of each member nation, and meets whenever at least two member states think it necessary. Meeting sites are established on a rotating basis. Any disputes among member states as a result of application, construction, or noncompliance regarding provisions related to education are initially resolved by direct diplomatic negotiations. Should the countries not reach an accord or only partially resolve the dispute, they resort to procedures set out in the dispute resolution system. Should the member nations enter into a bilateral convention or accord with provisions more favorable to their students, the member states in question can apply whichever provisions they consider most advantageous.

== Free trade zones ==
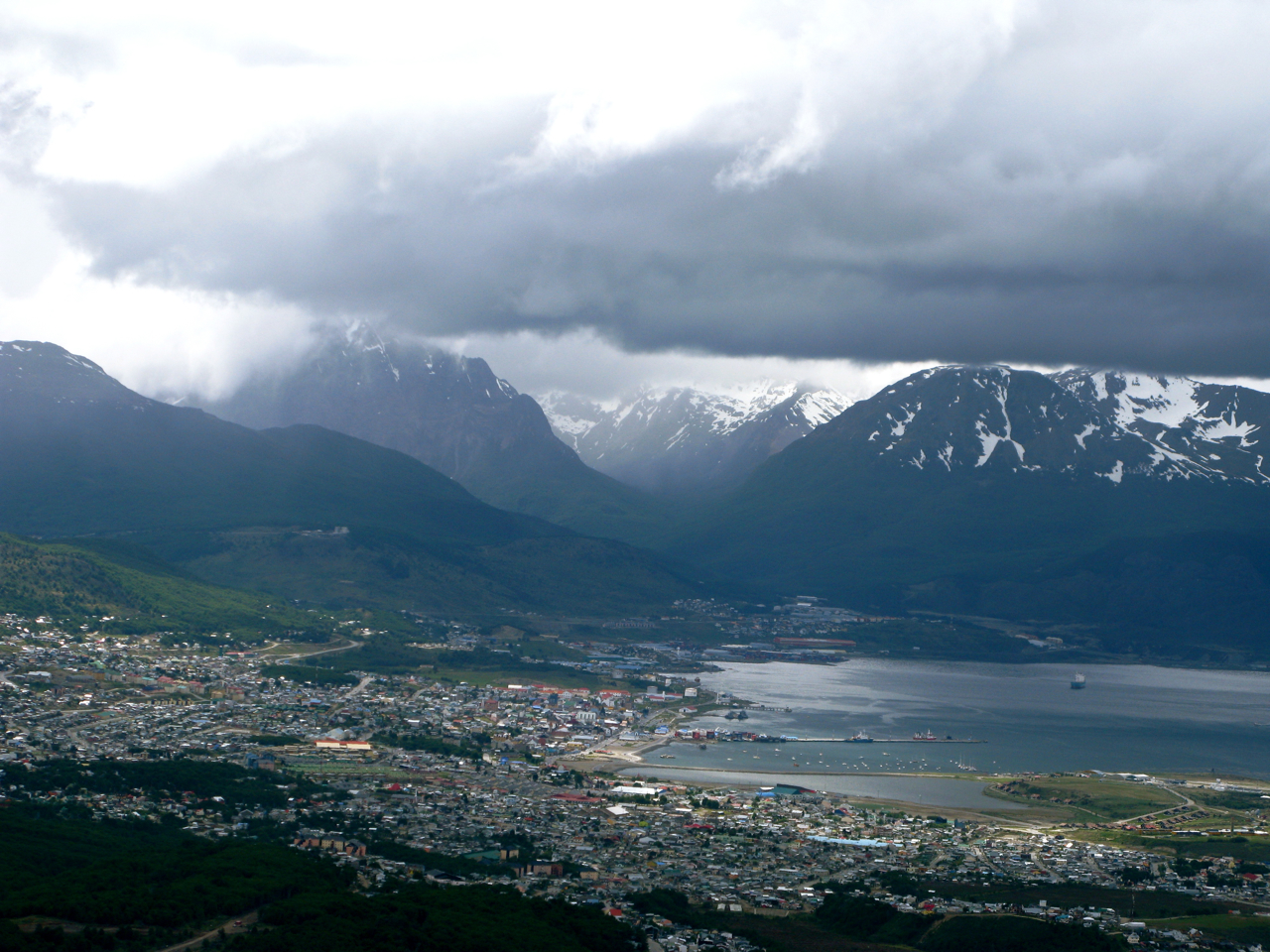
The Province of Tierra del Fuego in Argentina has a free-trade zone.

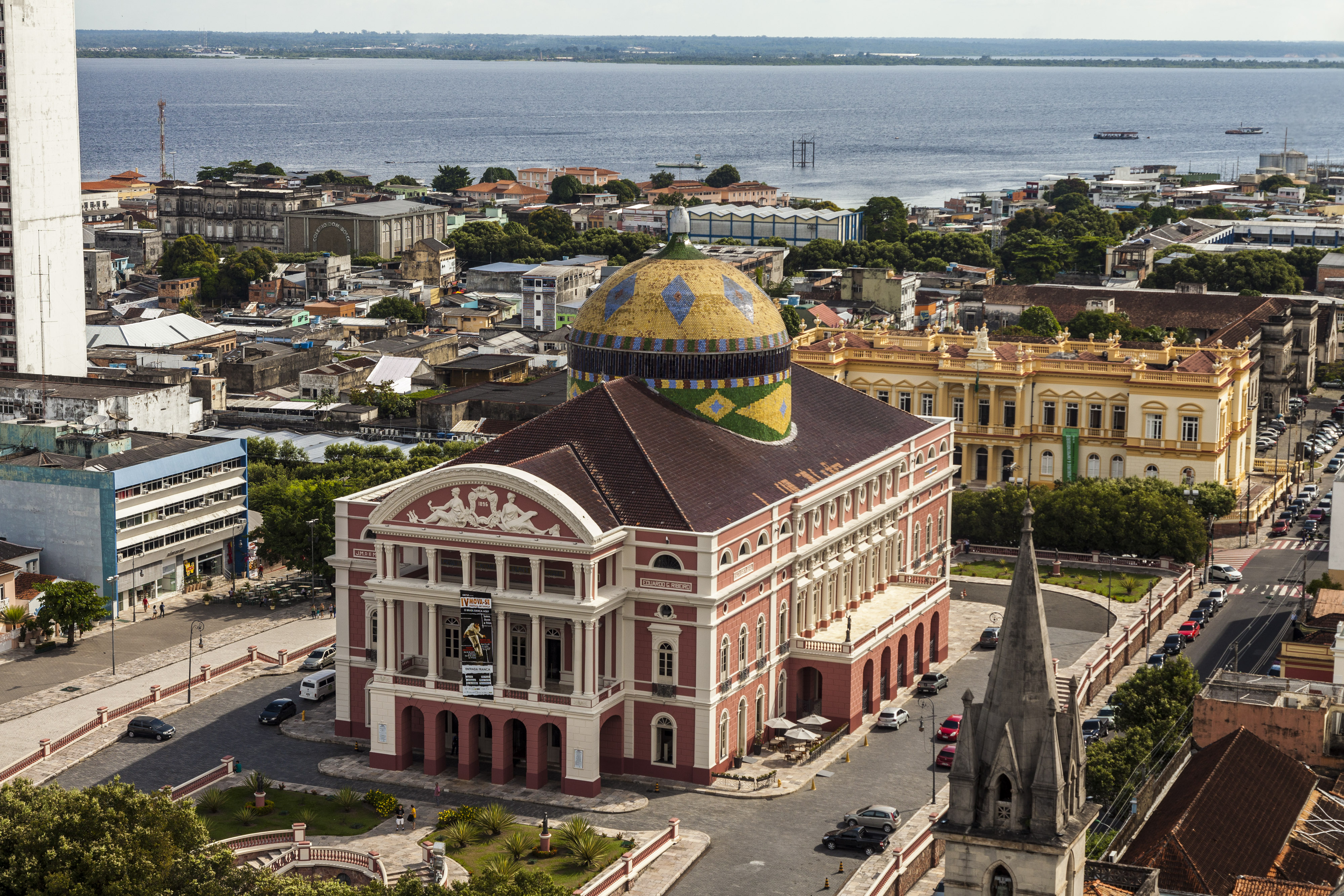
The city of Manaus, Brazil, has a free-trade zone.

The member nations can have commercial free-trade zones, industrial free-trade zones, export processing zones, and special customs areas, all of which target providing merchandise marketed or produced in these areas with treatment different from that afforded in their respective customs territories. Uruguay's Vice-president Danilo Astori said the issue of a free trade agreement with the United States must be dealt and that "opportunities must be built". He also said that "each Mercosur country should have a multiplicity of memberships. Mercosur must have joint international policies, an agreement on moderate protection from third parties and above all must have agreements with other trade blocks".

=== Tariffs ===
The member states can assess merchandise from these areas with the common external tariff used for Mercosur merchandise, or, in the case of certain special products, the domestic tariff prevailing in each individual state. In this way, the products from the free-trade zones can have the more favorable tax treatment established under Southern Common Market, given to the merchandise produced in the normal customs zones of each member state or, in the case of certain special products, can have the normal customs treatment prevailing in each nation. Products coming from outside of Mercosur are highly taxed so that local companies do not feel the need to compete with large international companies.

=== Safeguards ===
Products produced or marketed in the free-trade zones of each member nation will be eligible for the safeguard system whenever this entails an increase not provided for in imports, but capable of causing damages or threatened damages to the importer country.

=== Incentives ===
In the event of the producing nation's granting special incentives for production from the free-trade zones that are not compatible with the corresponding guidelines established under the General Agreement on Tariffs and Trade (GATT), the member nation can make any adjustments needed to return the situation to equilibrium.

=== Creation ===
The member nations agreed that any free-trade zones that in August 1994 were already in operation could operate normally under Mercosur, along with any that are set up in light of legal guidelines prevailing or in course in congress during this same time period. This means that a member nation can no longer create new free-trade zones that are more privileged. Mercosur is an effective agreement for its members.

=== Manaus and Tierra del Fuego FTZs ===
The implementation of Mercosur did not affect the special Manaus, Brazil, and Tierra del Fuego, Argentina free-trade zones until 2013.

== Reciprocal promotion and protection ==
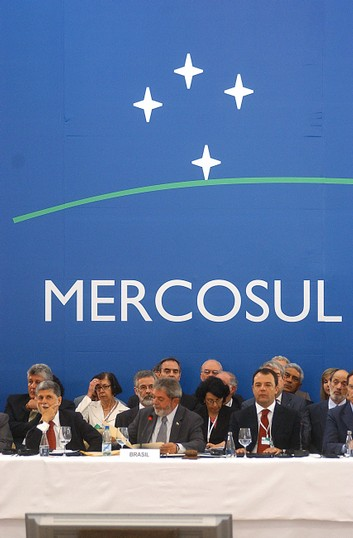
Celso Amorim, Luiz Inácio Lula da Silva, Sérgio Cabral Filho during the leadership of Mercosur/Mercosul

The nations subscribing to the Asunción Treaty consider that the creation and maintenance of conditions favorable to individual or corporate investment for the jurisdiction of one of the member states in the territory of another state is essential to intensify the economic cooperation targeted so as to accelerate the integration process among all four member states. In this context, Argentina, Uruguay, Paraguay and Brazil signed on 1 January 1994 in the city of Colonia del Sacramento, Uruguay, the Colonia Protocol for the Reciprocal Promotion and Protection of Mercosur Investments (Colonia Protocol). It was established in this protocol that investments under Mercosur by investors resident or domiciled in the territory of any member state will be entitled to treatment no less favorable than that accorded by the other member state to national investors or nonmember states.

=== Investors ===
For the purposes of constructing the Colonia Protocol, investors are considered to be: Individuals who are citizens of any of the member nations or that reside there on a permanent basis or are domiciled there, with due regard for legislation prevailing in such territory; Legal entities organized pursuant to the legislation of one of the member nations that are headquartered there; and Legal entities organized in the territory where the investment is made, actually and directly or indirectly controlled by the legal entities or individuals mentioned above.

=== Investment ===
The term investment includes all types of assets such as: movable or immovable property, such as rights in rem and guarantee in rem rights; shares, corporate holdings and any other type of corporate participation; credit instruments and rights that may have an economic value; intellectual property rights or materials, Including copyrights and industrial property rights such as patents, industrial drawings, trademarks, commercial names, technical procedures, know-how and goodwill; Economic concessions involving public law, such as research, cultivation, extraction or natural resource exploration concessions.

=== Freedom to invest ===
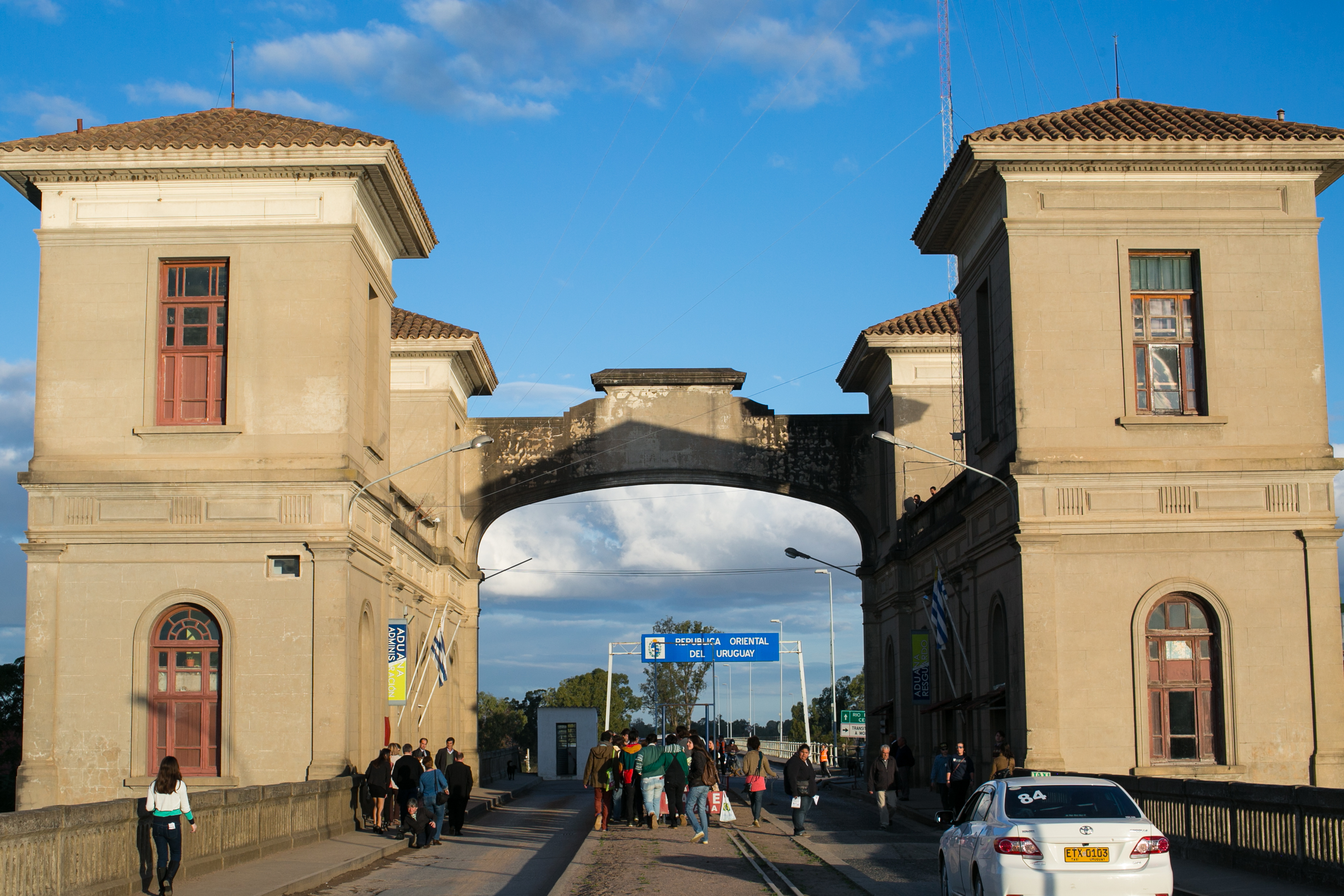
Brazil–Uruguay international border

The nation receiving the investment cannot avail itself of unjustified or discriminatory means capable of restricting the investor's freedom to manage, maintain, use, enjoy and dispose of its investments.

=== Tax ===
The member states are not however obligated to extend to investors in the other nations signatory to the Colonia Protocol the benefits of any treatment, preference or privilege resulting from international accords relating fully or partially to tax matters.

=== Exceptions ===
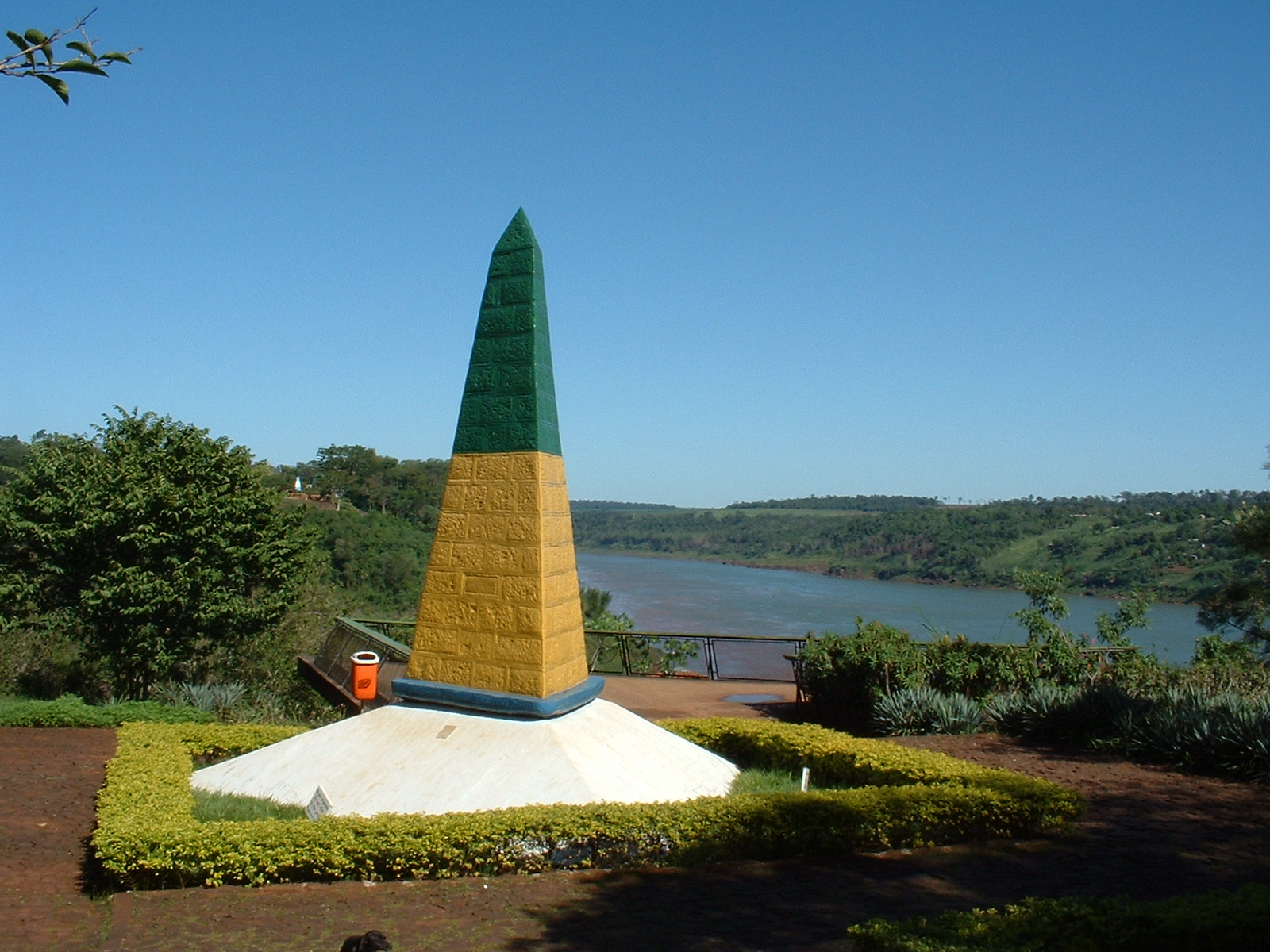
Landmark of the Three Borders – Argentina, Brazil, and Paraguay, in Foz do Iguaçu

In addition, the member nations can temporarily establish a list of exceptions where the new treatment will not yet prevail. In this way, the various member nations decided to except the following economic sectors:

- Argentina: ownership of real estate on the frontier strip, air transportation, naval industry, nuclear power plants, uranium mining, insurance and fishery;
- Brazil: mineral prospecting and mining; use of hydraulic energy; health care; television and radio broadcasting and telecommunications in general, acquisition or leasing of rural properties; participation in the financial intermediation, insurance, social security and capitalization systems; chartering and cabotage as well as inland navigation;
- Paraguay: ownership of real property on the frontier strip; communications, including radio and television broadcasting; air, sea and land transportation; electricity, water and telephone services; prospecting for hydrocarbons and strategic minerals; import and refining of petroleum derivatives and postal services;
- Uruguay: electricity; hydrocarbons; basic petrochemicals, atomic energy; prospecting for strategic minerals; financial intermediation; railways, telecommunications; radio broadcasting; press and audiovisual means.

=== Expropriation and compensation ===
The member nations undertook to do nothing to nationalize or expropriate investments in their territories that pertain to investors from the signatory countries, unless such measures are taken based on public need. In such case, nothing discriminatory can be done, but everything must be implemented by due legal process. Compensation for the investment holder that is expropriated or nationalized should be both adequate and effective, and made in advance, based on the real investment value determined at the time the decision is publicly announced by the proper authorities. This payment will be updated until actual payment, and the affected investor will receive interest.

=== Transfers ===
The original member state investors will be ensured free transfer of their investments and any earnings thereon. These transfers can be made in freely convertible currency, using the exchange rate prevailing on the market pursuant to the procedures established by the member state receiving the investment. Member nations cannot adopt any exchange measures restricting free transfer of the funds invested or from activities exercised in their respective territories.

== Role and potential ==
A clickable Euler diagram showing the relationships between various multinational organizations in the Americas

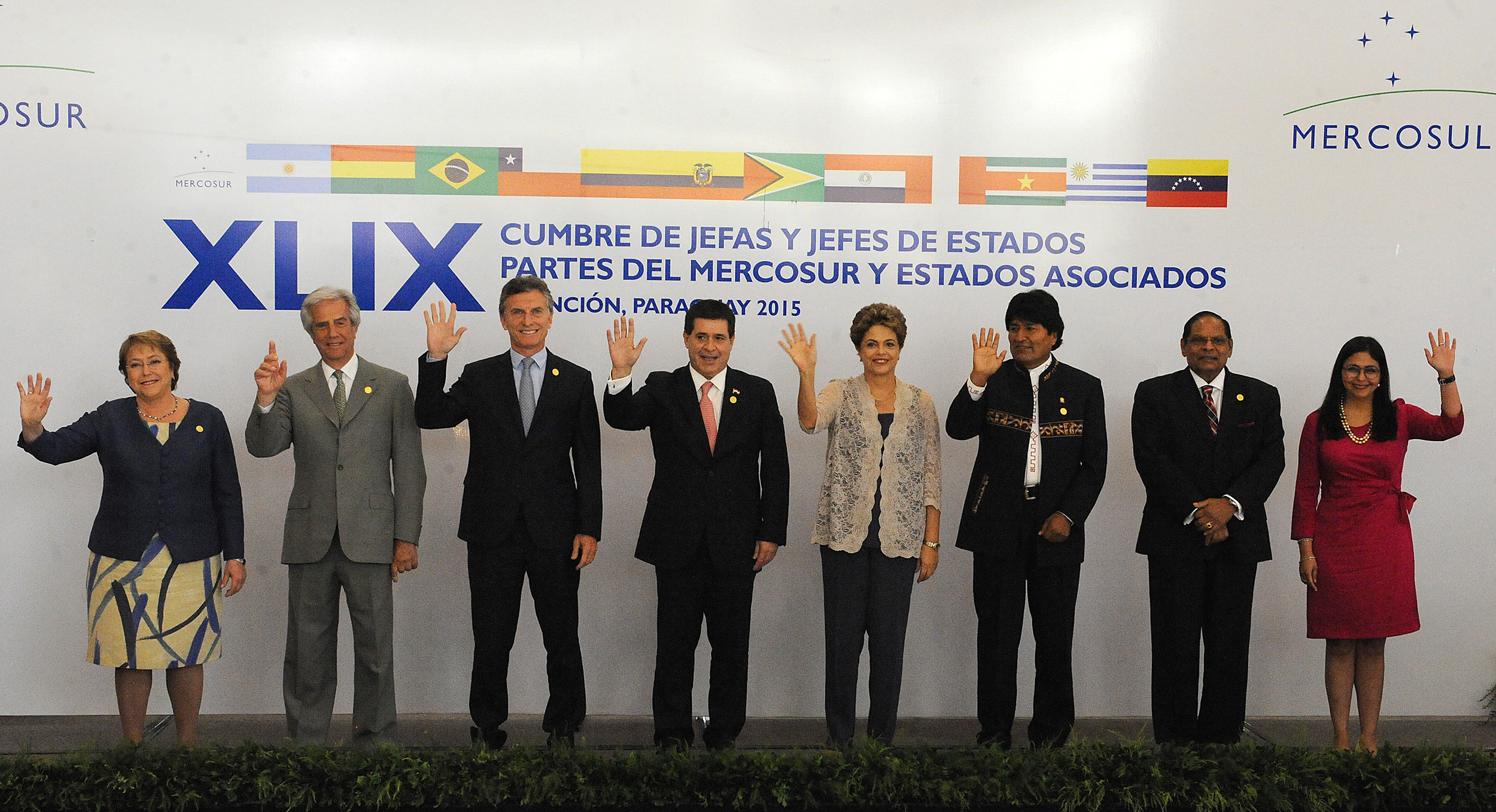
Plenary Session of the 49th Mercosur Summit in Asuncion, 28 December 2015

Some South Americans see Mercosur as giving the capability to combine resources to balance the activities of other global economic powers, especially the North American Free Trade Agreement (NAFTA) and the European Union. The organization could also potentially pre-empt the Free Trade Area of the Americas (FTAA); however, over half of the current Mercosur member countries rejected the FTAA proposal at the IV Cumbre de las Américas (IV Summit of the Americas) in Argentina in 2005.

The development of Mercosur was arguably weakened by the collapse of the Argentine economy in 2001 and it has still seen internal conflicts over trade policy, between Brazil and Argentina, Argentina and Uruguay, Paraguay and Brazil, etc. In addition, many obstacles must be addressed before the development of a common currency in Mercosur.

In 2004, Mercosur signed a cooperation agreement with the Andean Community of Nations trade bloc (CAN) and they published a joint letter of intent for future negotiations towards integrating all of South America. The prospect of increased political integration within the organization, as per the European Union and advocated by some, is still uncertain. Bolivia, a member of both Mercosur and CAN, plays a crucial part in relations, says Marion Hörmann, since Bolivia is traditionally seen as a mediator between the Andean countries and the rest of South America.

The bloc comprises a population of more than 270 million people, and the combined gross domestic product of the full-member nations is in excess of US$3.0 trillion a year (Purchasing power parity, PPP) according to International Monetary Fund (IMF) numbers, making Mercosur the fifth-largest economy in the World. It is the fourth-largest trading bloc after the European Union. The problem of economic asymmetries among the partners has been addressed by many analysts reaching dissimilar conclusions. However, there is agreement that this situation is a determining factor in characterizing the evolution of MERCOSUR.

The working of Mercosur has not met with universal approval within interested countries. Chile has to a certain extent preferred to pursue bilateral agreements with trading partners, and there have been calls from Uruguayan politicians to follow this example.

== FTA with third parties ==
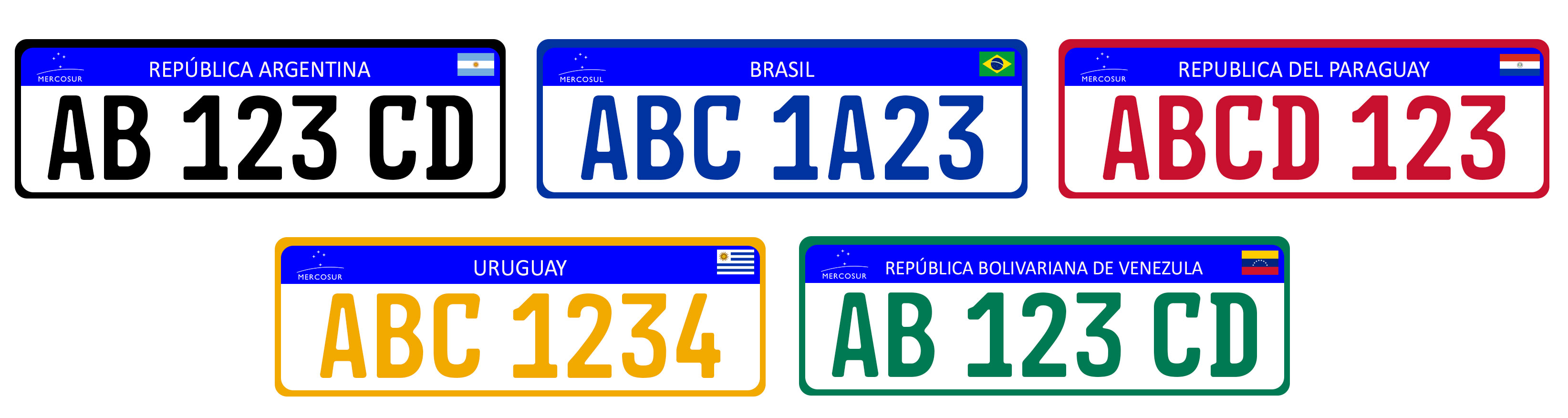
Mercosur common plates, in use since January 2016

With the 2005 cooperation agreement with Mercosur, the Andean Community gained four new associate members: Argentina, Brazil, Paraguay, and Uruguay. These four Mercosur members were granted associate membership by the Andean Council of Foreign Ministers meeting in an enlarged session with the commission (of the Andean Community) on 7 July 2005. This move reciprocates the actions of Mercosur, which granted associate membership to all the Andean Community nations by virtue of the Economic Complementarity Agreements (Free Trade Agreements) signed between the CAN and individual Mercosur members.

Mercosur signed free trade agreements with Israel in December 2007, with Egypt in August 2010, the State of Palestine in December 2011 and Lebanon on 18 December 2014. In 2016, Brazilian presidents, Dilma Rousseff and later Michel Temer, along with Argentine President Macri began to place pressure to negotiate a free trade agreement between Mercosur and the European Union and other Latin American nations. In June 2019, a deal for a European Union–Mercosur Free Trade Agreement was reached in principle, with final text to be negotiated. Negotiations concluded in December 2024, and the agreement proceeded towards ratification. If ratified, the agreement would eliminate over 90% of tariffs in both directions. In November 2023, Mercosur and Singapore concluded a free trade agreement. A free trade agreement with EFTA was concluded in July 2025.

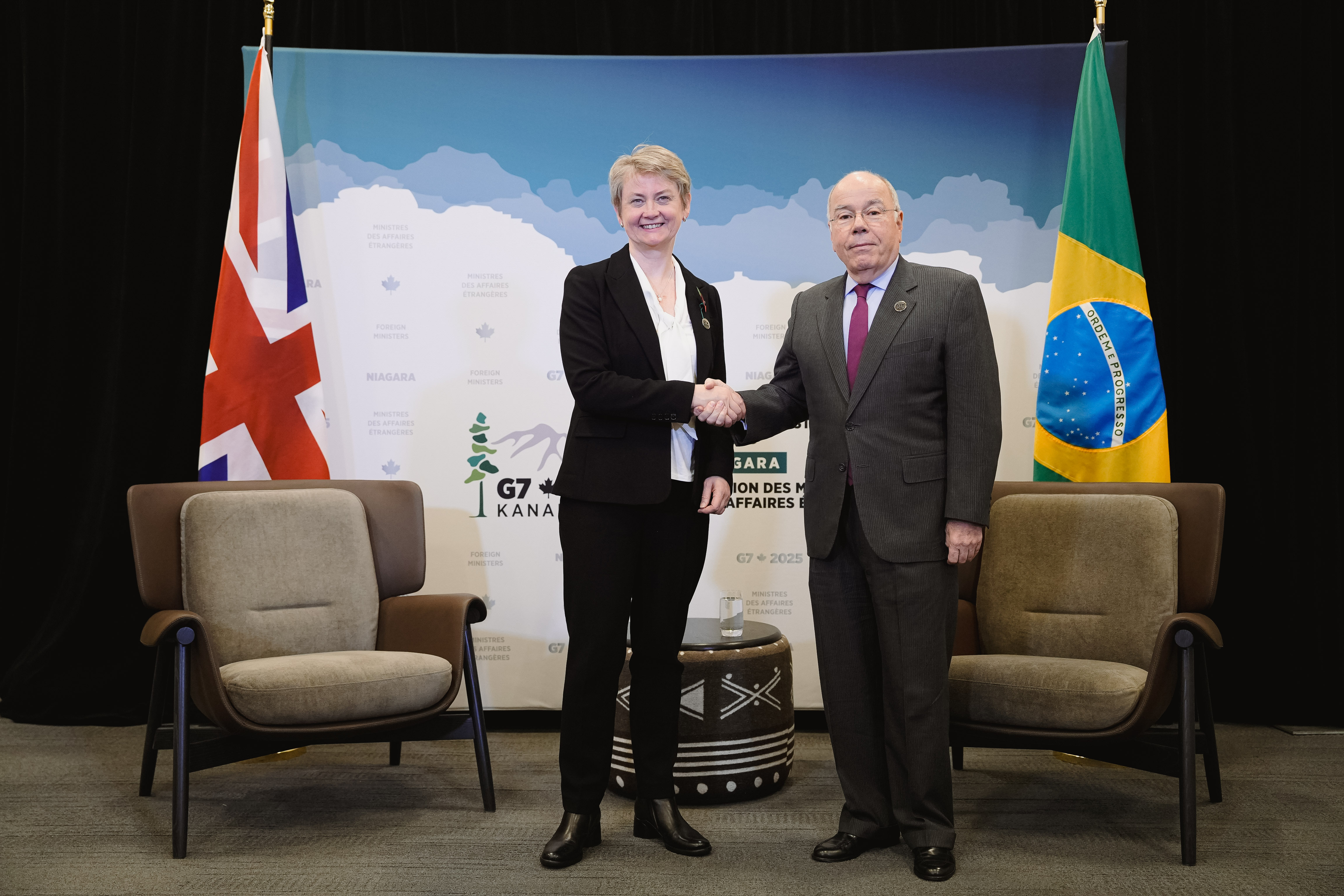
British Foreign Secretary Yvette Cooper meets with Brazilian Foreign Minister Mauro Vieira in Toronto, November 2025.

In January 2020, following the withdrawal of the United Kingdom from the European Union, the UK sought a trade deal with Mercosur, a trade bloc. On 11 November 2025, Brazilian Foreign Minister Mauro Vieira and British Foreign Secretary Yvette Cooper discussed starting formal negotiations for a free trade agreement between the UK and Mercosur during a G7 Foreign Ministers meeting in Toronto; Brazil agreed to discuss the next steps with trade bloc members, Argentina, Bolivia, Paraguay, and Uruguay. In 2026, Canada and Mercosur resumed negotiations for a free trade agreement, and the proceedings have been expedited with the hopes of reaching a deal by autumn of that year.

== See also ==
- Andean Community
- Bolivarian Alliance for the Americas
- Central American Common Market
- Citizenship of the Mercosur
- Community of Latin American and Caribbean States
- Copa Mercosur
- Free trade area
- Free Trade Area of the Americas
- Gaucho (currency)
- Latin America–United Kingdom relations
- List of country groupings
- List of multilateral free trade agreements
- Market access
- Pacific Alliance
- Road Network of the MERCOSUR
- Rules of origin
- Union of South American Nations (UNASUR)
