= Protocol of Ouro Preto =

1994 treaty

Additional Protocol to the Treaty of Asunción on the Institutional Structure of MERCOSUR
- Signed: December 17, 1994
- Location: Ouro Preto
- Effective: December 15, 1995
- Amendment: Treaty of Asunción
- Signatories: Argentina; Brazil; Paraguay; Uruguay
- Languages: Spanish; Portuguese

The 1994 Protocol of Ouro Preto was the continuation of economic policies setting up a customs union, as set forth four years earlier in the Treaty of Asunción by the four original Mercosur states, Argentina, Brazil, Paraguay and Uruguay. It officially established Mercosur as an international customs union.
