= 1991 =

1991 in various calendars
- Gregorian calendar: 1991; MCMXCI
- Ab urbe condita: 2744
- Armenian calendar: 1440; ԹՎ ՌՆԽ
- Assyrian calendar: 6741
- Baháʼí calendar: 147–148
- Balinese saka calendar: 1912–1913
- Bengali calendar: 1397–1398
- Berber calendar: 2941
- British Regnal year: 39 Eliz. 2 – 40 Eliz. 2
- Buddhist calendar: 2535
- Burmese calendar: 1353
- Byzantine calendar: 7499–7500
- Chinese calendar: 庚午年 (Metal Horse); 4688 or 4481 — to — 辛未年 (Metal Goat); 4689 or 4482
- Coptic calendar: 1707–1708
- Discordian calendar: 3157
- Ethiopian calendar: 1983–1984
- Hebrew calendar: 5751–5752
- Hindu calendars
- Vikram Samvat: 2047–2048
- Shaka Samvat: 1912–1913
- Kali Yuga: 5091–5092
- Holocene calendar: 11991
- Igbo calendar: 991–992
- Iranian calendar: 1369–1370
- Islamic calendar: 1411–1412
- Japanese calendar: Heisei 3 (平成３年)
- Javanese calendar: 1923–1924
- Juche calendar: 80
- Julian calendar: Gregorian minus 13 days
- Korean calendar: 4324
- Minguo calendar: ROC 80 民國80年
- Nanakshahi calendar: 523
- Thai solar calendar: 2534
- Tibetan calendar: ལྕགས་ཕོ་རྟ་ལོ་ (male Iron-Horse); 2117 or 1736 or 964 — to — ལྕགས་མོ་ལུག་ལོ་ (female Iron-Sheep); 2118 or 1737 or 965
- Unix time: 662688000 – 694223999

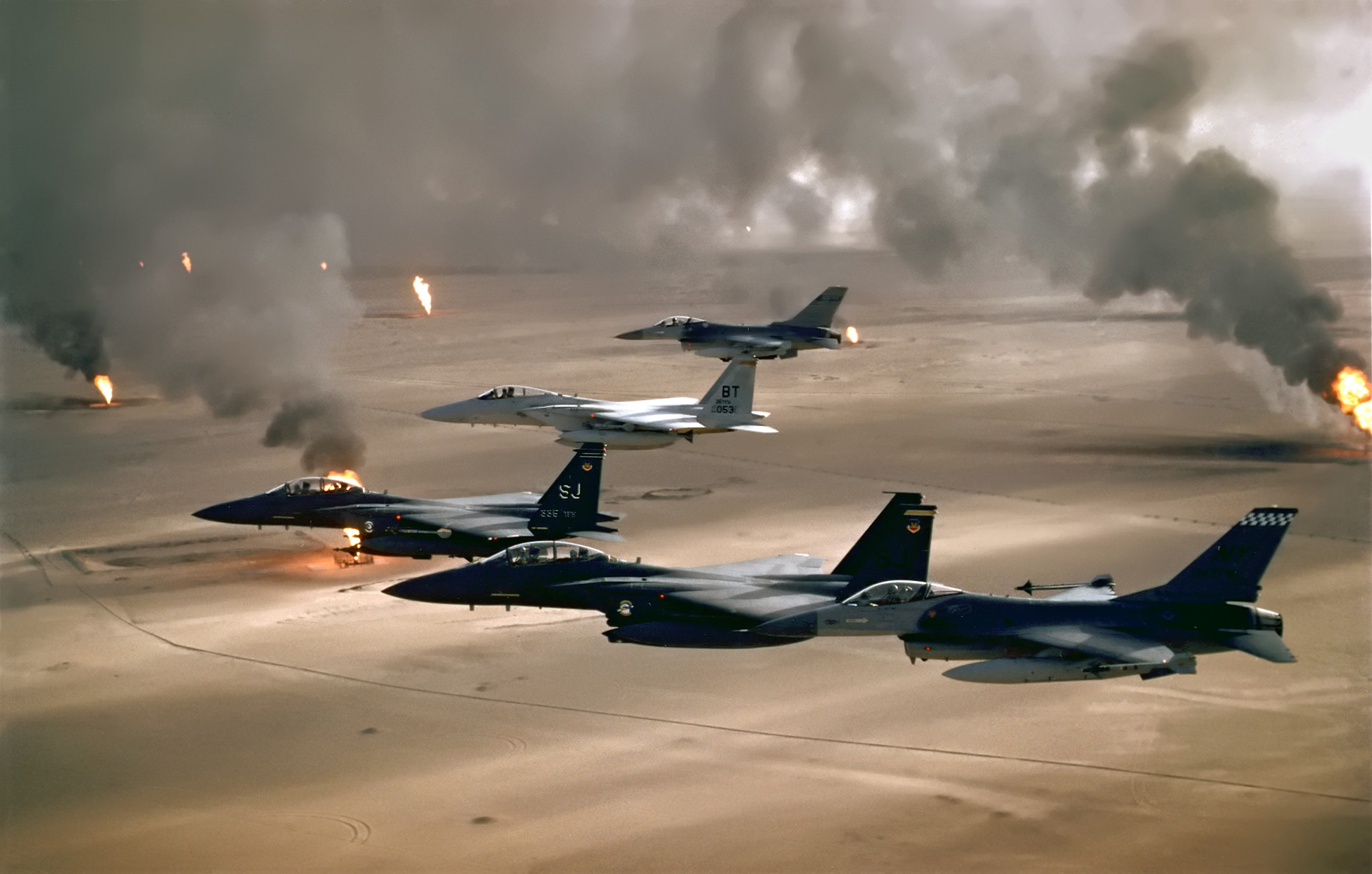
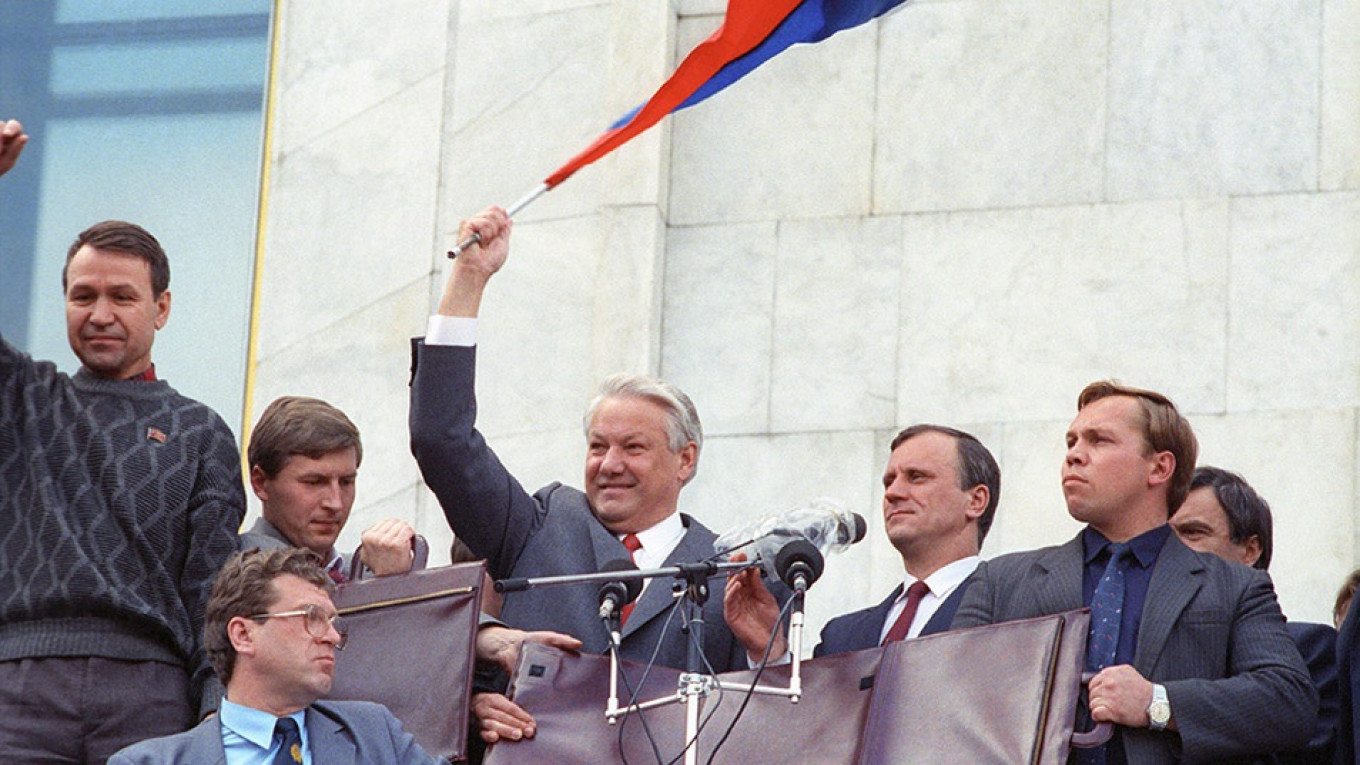
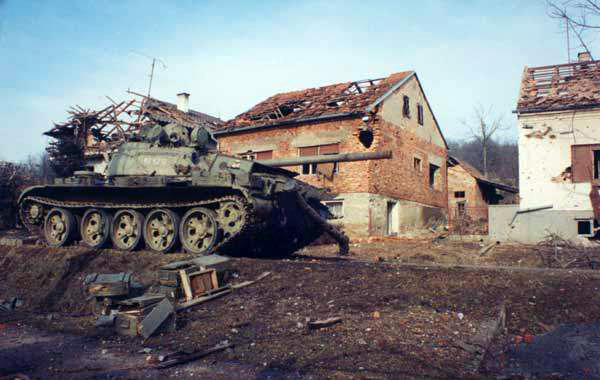
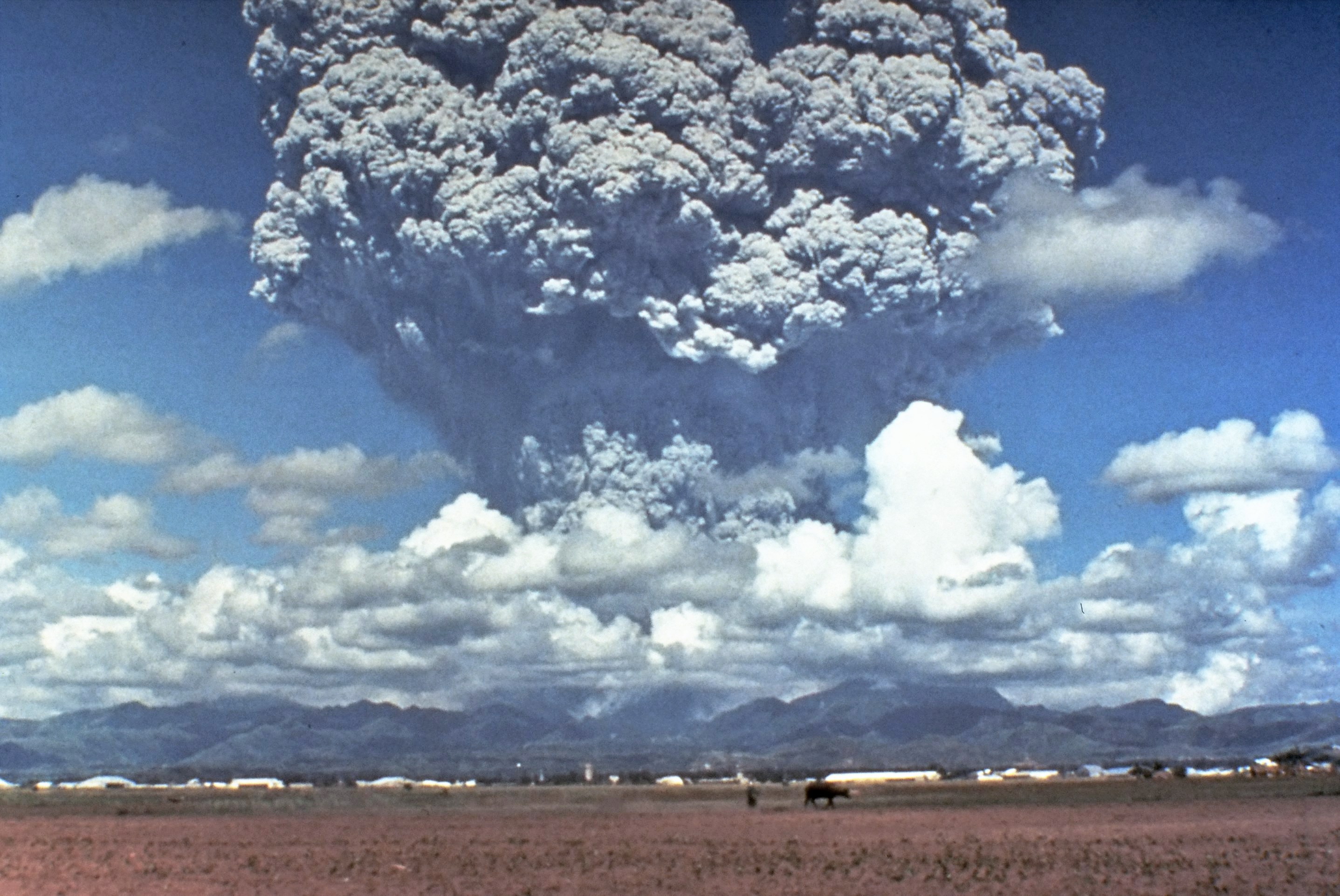
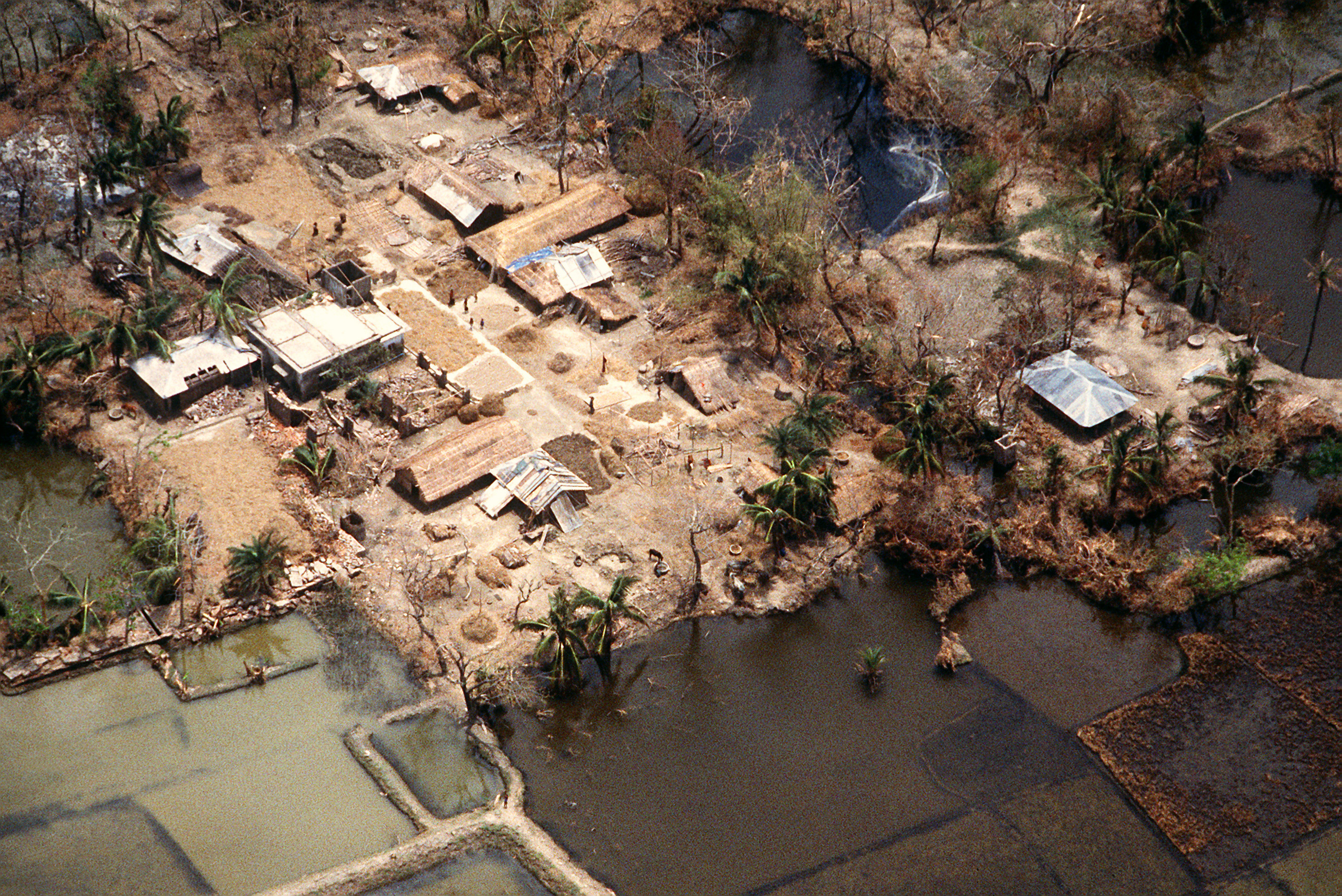
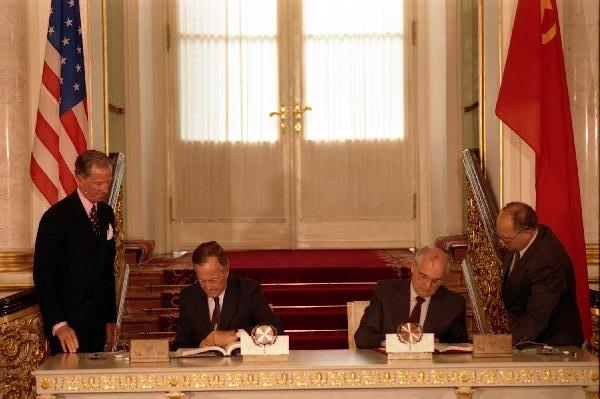
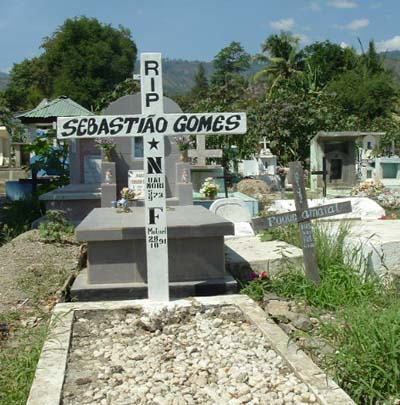
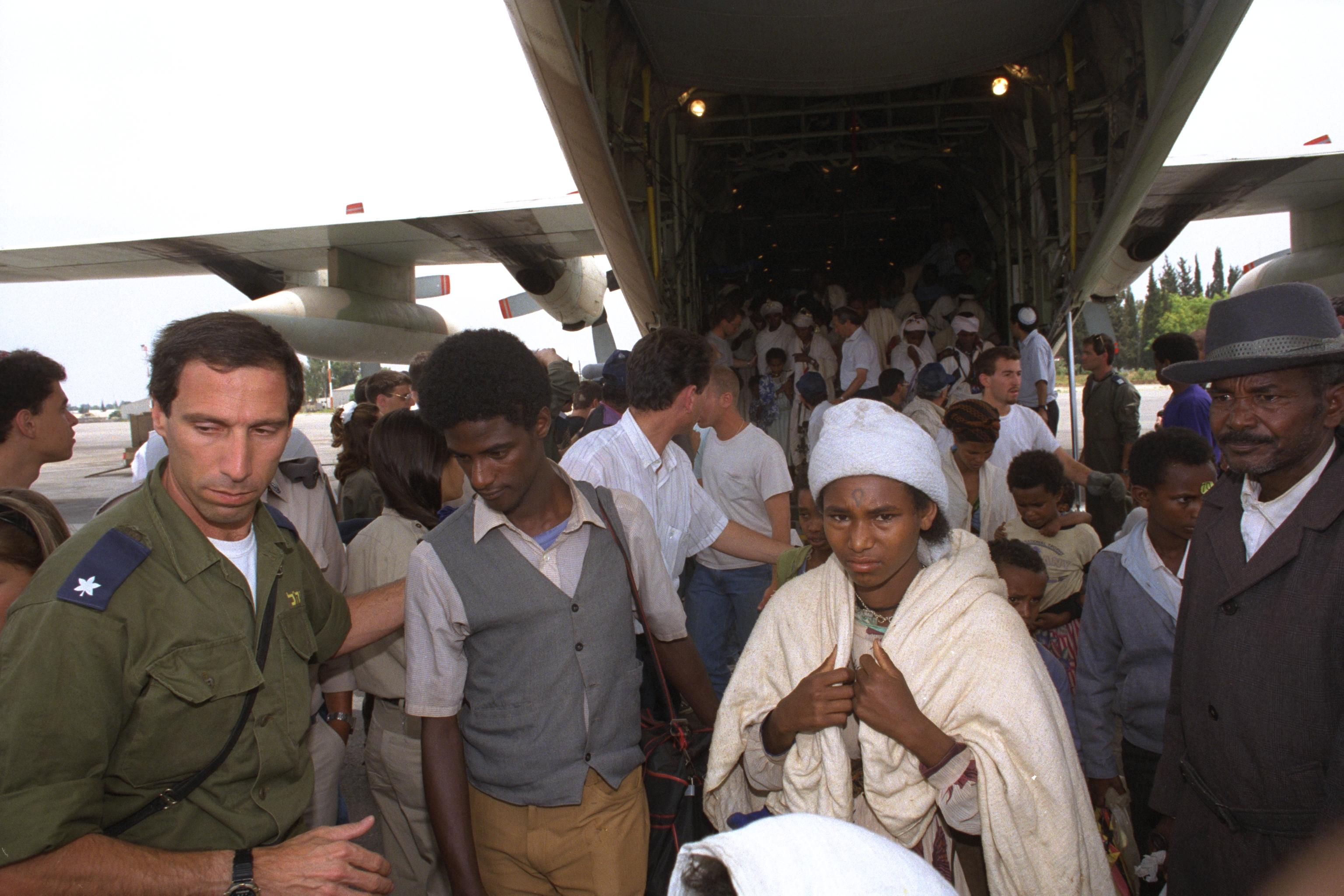
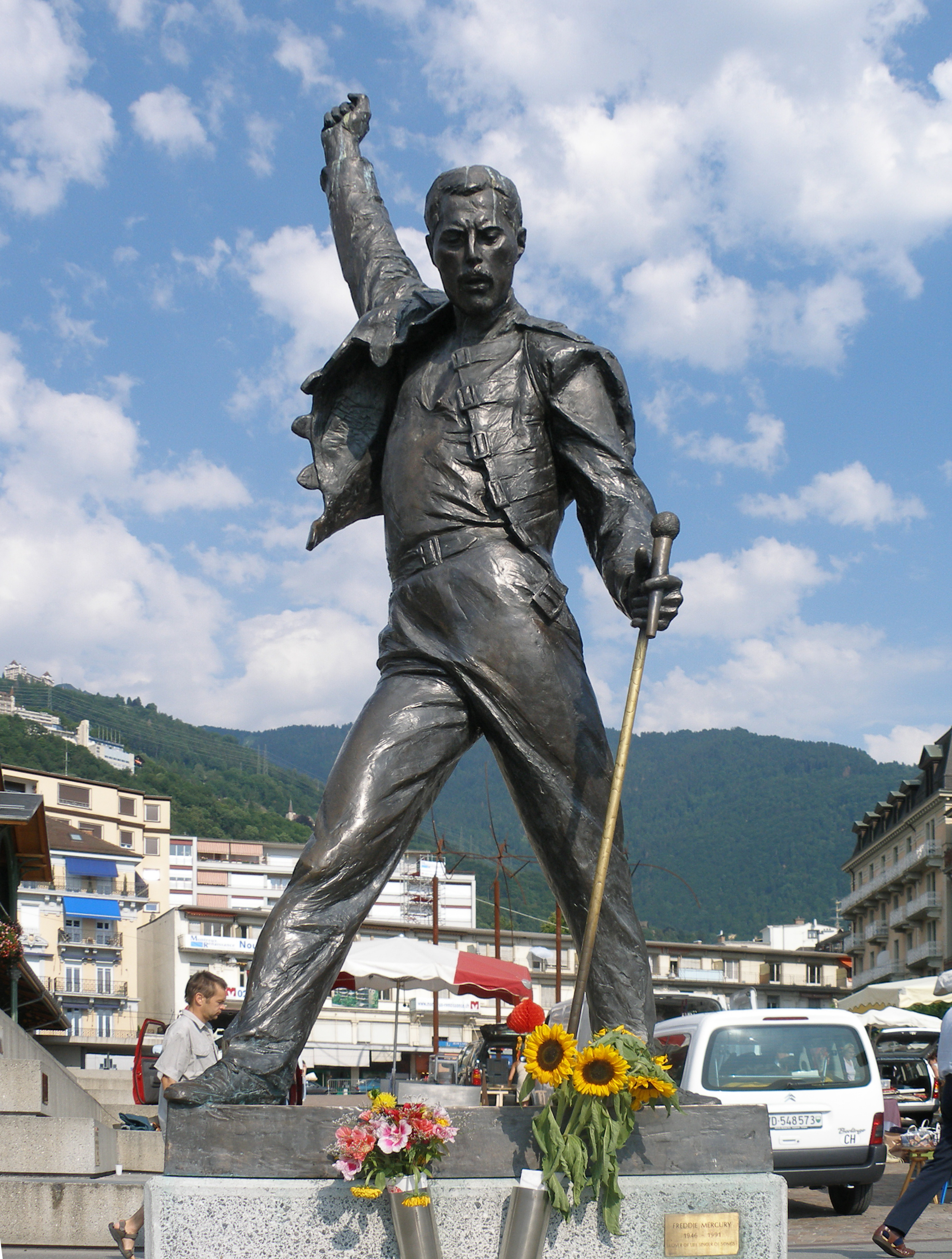
From top to bottom, left to right: the Gulf War air campaign begins, as coalition forces launch an assault leading to victory over Iraq; the 1991 Soviet coup attempt and Dissolution of the Soviet Union bring an end to the Soviet Union and the Cold War; the Yugoslav Wars begin, including the Ten-Day War in Slovenia and the Croatian War of Independence; the 1991 eruption of Mount Pinatubo becomes one of the largest volcanic eruptions of the 20th century; the 1991 Bangladesh cyclone kills over 100,000; START I is signed to reduce strategic nuclear weapons; the Santa Cruz massacre sees Indonesian forces kill protesters in East Timor; Operation Solomon evacuates thousands of Ethiopian Jews to Israel; and Freddie Mercury dies of AIDS.

1991 (MCMXCI) was a common year starting on Tuesday of the Gregorian calendar, the 1991st year of the Common Era (CE) and Anno Domini (AD) designations, the 991st year of the 2nd millennium, the 91st year of the 20th century, and the 2nd year of the 1990s decade.

It was the final year of the Cold War, which had begun in 1947. Towards the end of the year, the Soviet Union collapsed, leaving fifteen sovereign republics and the CIS in its place. In July 1991, India abandoned its policies of dirigisme, license raj and autarky and began extensive liberalisation to its economy. This increased GDP but also increased income inequality over the next two decades. A UN-authorized coalition force from 34 nations fought against Iraq, which had invaded and annexed Kuwait in the previous year, 1990. The conflict would be called the Gulf War and would mark the beginning of a since-constant American military presence in the Middle East. The clash between Serbia and the other Yugoslav republics would lead into the beginning of the Yugoslav Wars, which ran through the rest of the decade.

In the context of the apartheid, the year after the liberation of political prisoner Nelson Mandela, the Parliament of South Africa repeals the Population Registration Act, 1950, overturning the racial classification of the population, a key component of apartheid.

The year 1991 saw the rise of a ten-year-long boost of the US domestic economy with the Dow Jones Industrial Average remarkably closing in April at above 3,000 for the first time. This situation would only be cut short by the Dot-com bubble of 2000–2002.

In August, the World Wide Web, originally conceived during the previous year, was released outside CERN to other research institutions starting in January 1991 and publicly announced in August, also establishing the first website ever, "info.cern.ch". This step was a key factor that led to the mid-1990s public breakthrough of the internet, which would eventually accelerate the already ongoing globalization around the globe.

In terms of popular culture, during this year alternative rock saw a new height of popularity when some of the earliest music exponents of the virtually unknown grunge sound were released, including the influential Nevermind album by Seattle-based band Nirvana in September 1991. It was also in 1991 that hip-hop music reached an unprecedented mainstream level of success. Electronic music derivative forms were also starting to gain momentum and would define, along with the previous scenes, the sound for most of the decade.

== Events ==
=== January ===
- January 1 – Czechoslovakia becomes the second Eastern European country to abandon its command economy.
- January 5 – Georgian troops attack Tskhinvali, the capital of South Ossetia, starting the 1991–92 South Ossetia War.
- January 7 – 1991 Haitian coup d'état: An attempted coup by the Tonton Macoute, a paramilitary force under former dictator Jean-Claude Duvalier, is thwarted in Haiti. On July 30, Roger Lafontant, the leader of the coup attempt, is convicted by a jury of attempting to overthrow the country's first democratically elected government.
- January 9
  - Gulf War: U.S. Secretary of State James Baker meets with Iraqi Foreign Minister Tariq Aziz but fails to produce a plan for the withdrawal of Iraqi troops from Kuwait.
  - In Sebokeng, South Africa, gunmen open fire on mourners attending the funeral of an African National Congress leader, killing 45 people.
- January 12 – Gulf War: The 102nd U.S. Congress passes a resolution authorizing the use of military force to expel Iraqi forces from Kuwait.
- January 13 – Singing Revolution: Soviet forces storm Vilnius to stop Lithuanian independence, killing 14 civilians and injuring 702 more. In Latvia, a series of confrontations between the Latvian government and the Soviet government take place in Riga. Lithuania formally declares independence on February 16, and voters in Estonia and Latvia vote for independence on March 3.
- January 15
  - Gulf War: The UN deadline for the withdrawal of Iraqi forces from occupied Kuwait expires, preparing the way for the start of Operation Desert Storm.
  - Prime Minister of Cape Verde Pedro Pires resigns following his party's loss in the Cape Verdean parliamentary election. Later on February 17, António Mascarenhas Monteiro wins the country's first multiparty presidential election since 1975.
- January 16 – Gulf War: Operation Desert Storm begins with air strikes against Iraq.
- January 17
  - Gulf War: Iraq fires eight Scud missiles into Israel. Iraqi attacks continue with 15 people injured in Tel Aviv on January 19 and 96 people injured in Ramat Gan on January 22.
  - Harald V becomes king of Norway after the death of his father, Olav V.
- January 18 – Eastern Air Lines shuts down after 62 years of operations, citing financial problems. Later on December 4, Pan American World Airways ceases its operations.
- January 22 – Gulf War: The British Army SAS patrol, Bravo Two Zero, is deployed in Iraq.
- January 24 – The government of Papua New Guinea signs a peace agreement with separatist leaders from Bougainville Island, ending fighting that had gone on since 1988.
- January 26 – President Siad Barre is overthrown, and Somalia enters a civil war. Three days later, Ali Mahdi Muhammad is inaugurated as the next president.
- January 29
  - In South Africa, Nelson Mandela of the African National Congress and Mangosuthu Buthelezi of the Inkatha Freedom Party agree to end violence between the two organizations.
  - Gulf War: The first major ground engagement of the war, the Battle of Khafji, begins. The battle lasts until February 1.

=== February ===
- February 1
  - USAir Flight 1493 collides with a SkyWest Airlines Fairchild Metroliner at Los Angeles International Airport, killing 34 people.
  - A 6.4 mb Hindu Kush earthquake causes severe damage in northeast Afghanistan, leaving 848 dead and 200 injured.
- February 6 – A Boeing KC-135E Stratotanker is involved in an accident over Saudi Arabia when two engines on the left wing detach from the aircraft. The pilots manage to execute an emergency landing saving all four crew members on board. The aircraft is later repaired and returned to service.
- February 7
  - 1991 Haitian coup d'état: Haiti's first democratically elected president, Jean-Bertrand Aristide, is sworn in. He is ousted on September 30 and later reinstated in 1994. In response to the coup and in an effort to encourage the coup leaders to restore democracy, the U.S. expands trade sanctions on Haiti to include all goods except food and medicine on October 29.
  - The Provisional Irish Republican Army launches a mortar attack on 10 Downing Street in London during a cabinet meeting.
- February 11 – The Unrepresented Nations and Peoples Organization (UNPO) is formed in The Hague, Netherlands.
- February 13 – Gulf War: Two laser-guided "smart bombs" destroy an underground bunker in Baghdad, killing hundreds of Iraqis. US military intelligence claims it was a military facility while Iraqi officials identify it as a bomb shelter.
- February 15 – The Visegrád Group, establishing cooperation to move toward free-market systems, is established by the leaders of Czechoslovakia, Hungary, and Poland.
- February 18 – The Provisional Irish Republican Army explodes bombs in the early morning, at both Paddington station and Victoria station, in London.
- February 20
  - President of Albania Ramiz Alia dismisses the government of Prime Minister Adil Çarçani and appoints Fatos Nano as the next prime minister in an effort to stem pro-democracy protests.
  - Python, a programming language created by Guido van Rossum, Is released.
- February 22 – Gulf War: Iraq accepts a Soviet-proposed cease fire agreement. The U.S. rejects the agreement, instead saying that retreating Iraqi forces will not be attacked if they leave Kuwait within 24 hours.
- February 23 – In Thailand, General Sunthorn Kongsompong deposes Prime Minister Chatichai Choonhavan in a bloodless coup d'état.
- February 24 – Gulf War: At 4 a.m. local time ground troops cross the Saudi Arabian border and enter Kuwait, thus starting the ground phase of the war.
- February 25 – Gulf War: Part of an Iraqi Scud missile hits an American military barracks in Dhahran, Saudi Arabia, killing 29 U.S. soldiers and injuring 99 more. It is the single-most devastating attack on U.S. forces during the war.
- February 26 – Gulf War: On Baghdad radio, Iraqi leader Saddam Hussein announces the withdrawal of Iraqi troops from Kuwait. Iraqi soldiers set fire to Kuwaiti oil fields as they retreat; the fire lasts until November 7.
- February 27
  - Gulf War: U.S. President Bush declares victory over Iraq and orders a cease-fire. U.S. troops begin to leave the Persian Gulf on March 10.
  - In the Bangladeshi general election, the Bangladesh Nationalist Party wins 139 of 300 seats in the Jatiyo Sangshad, leading BNP leader Khaleda Zia to become the prime minister of Bangladesh on March 19.

=== March ===
- March 3
  - The first presidential election in the history of São Tomé and Príncipe is won by Miguel Trovoada.
  - A video captures the beating of motorist Rodney King by Los Angeles police officers. Four Los Angeles police officers are indicted on March 15 for the beating.
- March 6 – Prime Minister of India Chandra Shekhar resigns following a dispute with former prime minister Rajiv Gandhi, whose support had kept him in power.
- March 9 – Massive demonstrations are held against Slobodan Milošević in Belgrade; two people are killed, and tanks are deployed in the streets.
- March 10 – Salvadoran Civil War: In the Salvadoran legislative election, the Nationalist Republican Alliance wins 39 of the 48 seats in the legislative assembly.
- March 13
  - The U.S. Department of Justice announces that Exxon has agreed to pay $1 billion for the clean-up of the Exxon Valdez oil spill in Alaska.
  - The Acid Rain Treaty of 1991 is signed between the American and Canadian governments.
- March 14
  - Gulf War: Emir of Kuwait Jaber Al-Ahmad Al-Sabah returns to Kuwait after seven months of exile in Saudi Arabia.
  - The Troubles: After 16 years in prison for allegedly bombing an English public house in a Provisional IRA attack, the "Birmingham Six" are freed when a court determines that their conviction was unsafe and unsatisfactory.
  - Escondida in Chile's Atacama Desert –which is to become the world's most productive copper mine– is officially inaugurated.
- March 15
  - Germany formally regains complete independence after the four post-World War II occupying powers (France, the U.K., the U.S. and the U.S.S.R.) relinquish all remaining rights to the country.
  - The U.S. and Albania resume diplomatic relations for the first time since 1939.
- March 17
  - Dissolution of the Soviet Union: In a national referendum, 77% of voters in the Soviet Union vote in favor of keeping the 15 Soviet republics together; six Union Republics effectively boycott the referendum.
  - In the Finnish parliamentary election, the Centre Party wins 55 of 200 seats in the parliament, ending 25 years of dominance by the Social Democratic Party of Finland.
- March 23 – The Sierra Leone Civil War begins when the Revolutionary United Front attempts a coup against the Sierra Leone government.
- March 24 – The Beninese presidential election, Benin's first presidential election since 1970, is won by Nicéphore Soglo.
- March 26
  - In Mali, military officers led by Amadou Toumani Touré arrest President Moussa Traoré and suspend the constitution.
  - Argentina, Brazil, Uruguay and Paraguay sign the Treaty of Asunción, establishing Mercosur.
- March 30 – French woman and supercentenarian Jeanne Calment surpasses the final age achieved by Easter Wiggins (1874–1990) of 116 years, 36 days and becomes the oldest verified person in history.
- March 31
  - Albania holds its first multi-party elections since 1923. The socialist ruling Party of Labour of Albania won a landslide victory with 169 of the 250 seats in the parliament.
  - Dissolution of the Soviet Union: Georgia votes for independence from the Soviet Union while on April 9, the Supreme Council declares the independent Republic of Georgia.

=== April ===
- April 2 – Economy of the Soviet Union: Government-imposed price increases double or triple the cost of consumer goods in the Soviet Union.
- April 3 – Iraq disarmament crisis: The UN Security Council passes Resolution 687, which calls for the destruction or removal of all of Iraq's chemical and biological weapons and a complete ban of ballistic missiles with a range greater than 150 km. It also calls for an end to Iraq's support for international terrorism; it is accepted by Iraq three days later.
- April 4
  - U.S. Senator John Heinz and six other people are killed when a helicopter collides with their plane over Merion, Pennsylvania.
  - Forty people are taken hostage in Sacramento, California; six gunmen and hostages are killed.
- April 5
  - Former U.S. Senator John Tower and 22 others are killed in an airplane crash in Brunswick, Georgia.
  - Space Shuttle Atlantis leaves an observatory in Earth's orbit to study gamma rays before returning on April 11. It is followed by Space Shuttle Discovery, which studies instruments related to the Strategic Defense Initiative from April 29 to May 6. Space Shuttle Columbia carries the Spacelab into orbit on June 5.
- April 6 – Start of Operation Provide Comfort: Allied forces bring humanitarian relief to Kurds in Northern Iraq one day after the UN Security Council adopted Resolution 688 condemning political repression against the Iraqi people by Saddam Hussein's government.
- April 9 – The first Soviet troops leave Poland.
- April 10
  - A South Atlantic tropical cyclone develops in the Southern Hemisphere off the coast of Angola, the first of its kind to be documented by weather satellites.
  - The Italian ferry Moby Prince collides with an oil tanker in dense fog off Livorno, Italy, resulting in 140 deaths with one survivor.
- April 12 – The Warsaw Stock Exchange opens in Poland.
- April 14 – In the Netherlands, thieves steal 20 paintings worth $500 million from the Van Gogh Museum in Amsterdam; they are found in an abandoned car near the museum less than an hour later.
- April 15
  - The European Bank for Reconstruction and Development (EBRD) is inaugurated.
  - End of Apartheid: The European Economic Community lifts economic sanctions on South Africa.
- April 16–18 – General Secretary of the Communist Party of the Soviet Union Mikhail Gorbachev begins the first ever visit of a Soviet leader to Japan, but fails to resolve the two countries' dispute over ownership of the Kuril Islands.
- April 17 – The Dow Jones Industrial Average closes above 3,000 for the first time in history, at 3,004.46.
- April 18 – Iraq disarmament crisis: Iraq declares some of its chemical weapons and materials to the UN, as required by Resolution 687, and claims that it does not have a biological weapons program.
- April 19 – George Carey is enthroned as Archbishop of Canterbury, the spiritual leader of the worldwide Anglican Communion.
- April 22
  - A 7.7 M_{w} Limon earthquake strikes Costa Rica and Panama with a maximum Mercalli intensity, causing between 47 and 87 deaths and up to 759 injuries.
  - In Taiwan, the Temporary Provisions against the Communist Rebellion are abolished, having been in effect for 43 years.
- April 23 – Prime Minister of Iceland Steingrímur Hermannsson resigns following an inconclusive parliamentary election; he is succeeded by Davíð Oddsson on April 30.
- April 26
  - A series of 55 tornadoes break out in the central U.S., killing 21. The most notable tornado strikes Andover, Kansas.
  - Esko Aho at the age of 36 becomes the youngest-ever Prime Minister of Finland.

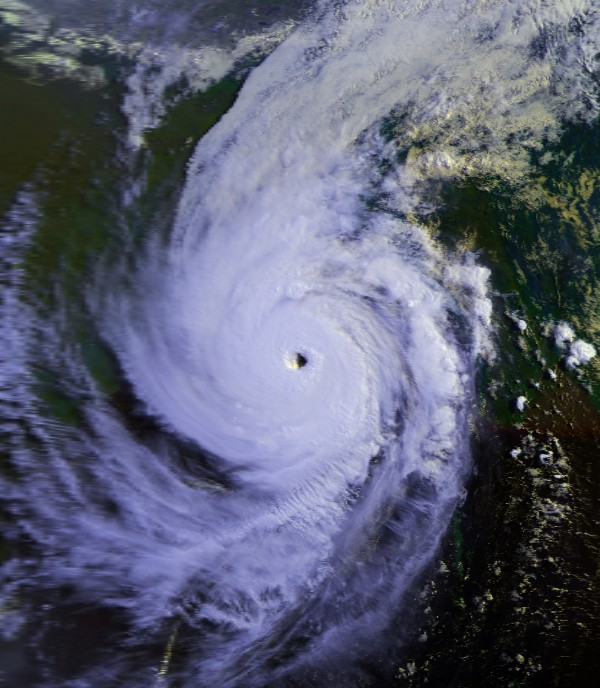
1991 Bangladesh Cyclone

- April 29
  - A tropical cyclone hits Bangladesh, killing an estimated 138,000 people.
  - A 7.0 M_{w} earthquake in Racha, Georgia, kills 270 people and leaves 100,000 others homeless.
- April 29 – 30 – In Lesotho, a bloodless coup ousts military ruler Justin Lekhanya, with Chairman of the Military Council Elias Phisoana Ramaema replacing him two days later.

=== May ===
- May 1 – Angolan Civil War: The MPLA and UNITA agree to the Bicesse Accords, which are formally signed on May 31 in Lisbon.
- May 6 – In the U.S., Time magazine publishes "The Thriving Cult of Greed and Power," an article highly critical of the Scientology movement.
- May 12 – Nepal holds its first multiparty legislative election since 1959.
- May 15 – Édith Cresson becomes France's first female prime minister.
- May 16 – Elizabeth II becomes the first British monarch to address the U.S. Congress during a 13-day royal visit in Washington, D.C.
- May 18 – Somaliland secedes from Somalia; its independence is not recognised by the international community.
- May 19 – Dissolution of Yugoslavia: In the Croatian independence referendum, voters in the Socialist Republic of Croatia vote to leave SFR Yugoslavia.
- May 21
  - At Sriperumbudur, India, a suicide bomber from LTTE attacks a political meeting, killing former Prime Minister Rajiv Gandhi and at least 14 others.
  - Ethiopian Civil War: Mengistu Haile Mariam, president of the People's Democratic Republic of Ethiopia, flees Ethiopia to Zimbabwe, effectively bringing the Ethiopian Civil War to an end.
- May 22 – Acting Prime Minister of South Korea Ro Jai-bong resigns in the wake of rioting following the beating to death of a student by police on April 26. He is succeeded by Chung Won-shik two days later.
- May 24 – Following authorisation by Israeli Prime Minister Yitzhak Shamir, Operation Solomon commences to airlift most of the remaining Beta Israel community from Ethiopia to Israel. The same day the Eritrean People's Liberation Front enters Asmara, the capital of Eritrea.
- May 25 – The Surinamese general election is won by the military-backed New Front for Democracy and Development.
- May 26 – Lauda Air Boeing 767 crashes near Bangkok, Thailand, killing all 223 people on board.
- May 28 – Ethiopian Civil War: The forces of the Ethiopian People's Revolutionary Democratic Front seize the capital Addis Ababa.

=== June ===
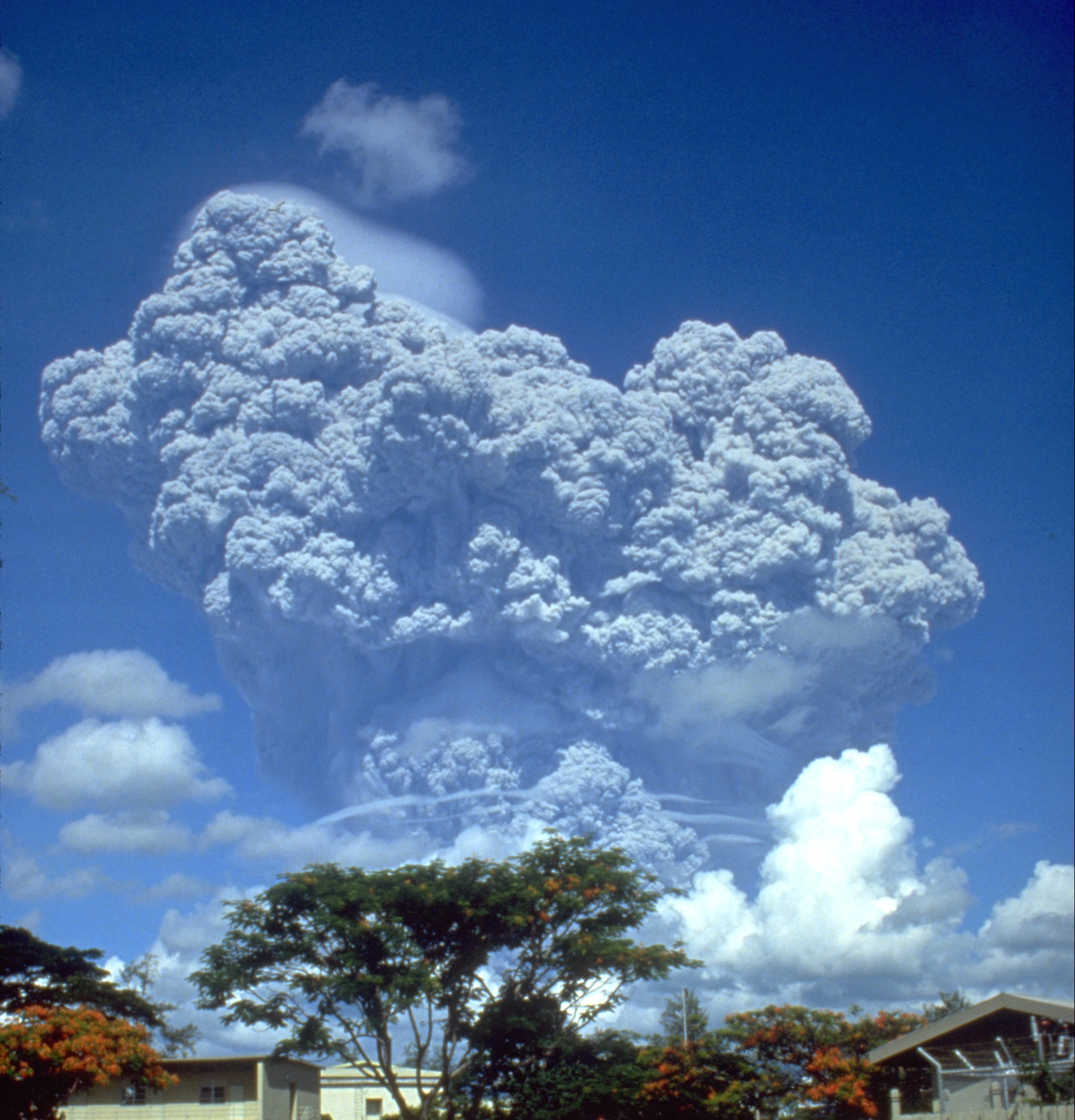
Mount Pinatubo

- June 3 – Mount Unzen in Japan erupts, killing 46 people as a result of pyroclastic flow.
- June 4
  - Fatos Nano resigns as Prime Minister of Albania following a nationwide strike. President of Albania Ramiz Alia appoints Ylli Bufi as his successor.
  - A large solar flare triggers an unusually large aurora as far south as Pennsylvania.
- June 5
  - President of Algeria Chadli Bendjedid declares a state of emergency as Prime Minister Mouloud Hamrouche resigns after 11 days of protests against the government; Hamrouche is replaced by Sid Ahmed Ghozali.
  - End of Apartheid: The South African Parliament votes to repeal laws banning Black ownership of land.
- June 7 – Approximately 200,000 people attend a parade of 8,800 returning Persian Gulf War troops in Washington, D.C.
- June 9 – A major collapse at the Emaswati Colliery in Swaziland traps 26 miners 65 meters below the surface; they are rescued 30 hours later.
- June 12
  - Boris Yeltsin is elected President of the Russian SFSR; he officially begins his term on July 10.
  - Sri Lankan civil war: Sri Lankan Army soldiers kill 152 civilians in Kokkadichcholai.
  - The Party of Labour of Albania is dissolved and succeeded by the Socialist Party of Albania, marking the end of communist rule in Albania.
- June 15
  - In the Philippines, Mount Pinatubo erupts in the second largest terrestrial eruption of the 20th century; the final death toll exceeds 800. The eruption causes a global cooling of around 0.4 °C.
  - The Indian general elections end; the Indian National Congress wins the most seats but fails to secure a majority. Six days later, Congress leader P. V. Narasimha Rao becomes Prime Minister of India.
- June 16 – Father's Day bank massacre: Four security guards are shot to death during a bank robbery at the United Bank Tower in Denver, Colorado, United States. The former police officer subsequently charged with the crime is acquitted, and the case remains unsolved.
- June 17
  - End of Apartheid: The South African parliament repeals the Population Registration Act, which has required racial classification of all South Africans at birth.
  - President of Turkey Turgut Özal appoints Mesut Yılmaz as Prime Minister following Yıldırım Akbulut's resignation. Yılmaz forms a new government on June 23, which lasts until November when it is replaced by the government of Süleyman Demirel.
- June 20
  - In West Germany, the Bundestag votes to move the capital from Bonn to Berlin.
  - Harry Collinson, the planning officer for Derwentside District Council, is shot dead at Butsfield, County Durham, England, and the incident is caught on camera by a BBC regional news crew.
- June 23 – Sonic the Hedgehog is released by Sega for the Sega Genesis to compete with Nintendo's Mario franchise.
- June 23 – 28 – Iraq disarmament crisis: UN inspection teams attempt to intercept Iraqi vehicles carrying nuclear related equipment. Iraqi soldiers fire warning shots in the air to prevent inspectors from approaching the vehicles.
- June 25 – Dissolution of Yugoslavia: Croatia and Slovenia declare their independence from Yugoslavia.
- June 28 – Dissolution of the Soviet Union: Comecon is dissolved in Moscow, Russia.

=== July ===
- July 1
  - In the U.S., telephone services go down in Washington, D.C., Pittsburgh, Los Angeles and San Francisco as a result of a software bug, affecting nearly 12 million customers.
  - The Warsaw Pact is officially dissolved in Prague, Czechoslovakia.
  - The world's first GSM telephone call is made in Finland.
- July 4 – The Constituent Assembly of Colombia proclaims a new constitution, allowing the President of Colombia César Gaviria to lift the country's seven-year-long state of siege.
- July 7 – Dissolution of Yugoslavia: The Brioni Agreement ends the Ten-Day War in Slovenia.
- July 9
  - End of Apartheid: The International Olympic Committee readmits South Africa to the Olympics. The following day, U.S. President Bush terminates 1986-enacted U.S. sanctions on South Africa.
  - Iran–Contra affair: Alan Fiers agrees to plead guilty to two charges of lying to the U.S. Congress. Later on September 16, D.C. Judge Gerhard Gesell issues a ruling clearing Col. Oliver North of all charges.
- July 11
  - A solar eclipse of record totality occurs in the Northern hemisphere and is witnessed by hundreds of millions of people in Hawaii, Mexico, Colombia and Brazil.
  - Nigeria Airways Flight 2120, a Douglas DC-8 operated by Canadian airline Nolisair, catches fire and crashes soon after takeoff from Jeddah, Saudi Arabia, killing all 261 people on board.
- July 15 – Chemical Bank and Manufacturers Hanover Corporation amalgamate, becoming the largest bank merger in history.
- July 16 – Soviet President Gorbachev arrives in London to ask for aid from the leaders of the G7.
- July 18 – The governments of Mauritania and Senegal sign a treaty ending the Mauritania–Senegal Border War, which has been fought since April 1989.
- July 22 – U.S. boxer Mike Tyson is arrested and charged with the rape, three days earlier, of Desiree Washington, a Miss Black America contestant, in Indianapolis, Indiana.
- July 24 – Finance Minister of India Manmohan Singh announces a new industrial policy, marking the start of economic liberalisation in India.
- July 29 – In New York City, a grand jury indicts Bank of Credit and Commerce International of the largest bank fraud in history, accusing the bank of defrauding depositors of US$5 billion.
- July 31
  - U.S. President Bush and Soviet President Gorbachev sign START I in Moscow, Soviet Union.
  - Singing Revolution: Soviet Special Purpose Police Unit forces (OMON) kill seven Lithuanian customs officials in Medininkai, the deadliest of the Soviet OMON assaults on Lithuanian border posts.

=== August ===
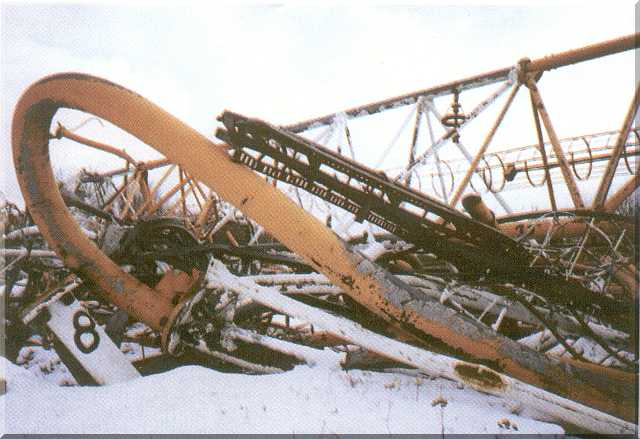
The Warsaw radio mast after its collapse on August 8

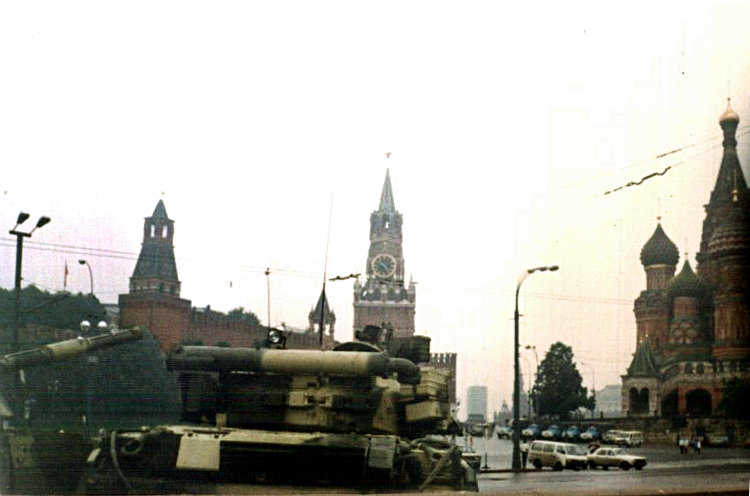
August 19: The coup attempt in Moscow

August 23: Restored flag of Russia

- August 1 – Israel agrees to participate in the Madrid Conference of 1991, which opens on October 30.
- August 4 – The cruise liner MTS Oceanos sinks off the coast of South Africa, leading to the rescue of all 571 passengers on board by SAAF helicopters.
- August 6 – Tim Berners-Lee, an English computer scientist working at CERN, announces the World Wide Web project and software on the alt.hypertext newsgroup. The first website, "info.cern.ch", is created.
- August 7 – Former Iranian prime minister Shapour Bakhtiar is assassinated in the Parisian suburb of Suresnes.
- August 8 – The Warsaw radio mast, the tallest structure in the world at the time, collapses.
- August 11 – Nickelodeon introduces its series of Nicktoons, with Doug, Rugrats and The Ren & Stimpy Show set three air premieres.
- August 17 – The remains of the Prussian King Frederick the Great are re-interred in Potsdam, Germany.
- August 17–20 – Hurricane Bob hits North Carolina and New England, killing 17 people and causing US$1.5 billion in damage.
- August 19 – Dissolution of the Soviet Union: Soviet President Mikhail Gorbachev is put under house arrest while vacationing in Crimea during an attempted coup. Led by Vice President Gennady Yanayev and seven others, the coup collapses in less than 72 hours and is protested by over 100,000 people outside the parliament building. Gorbachev returns to Moscow three days later and arrests the coup leaders.
- August 20 – Singing Revolution: Estonia declares independence from the Soviet Union, followed by Latvia the next day.
- August 22 – Singing Revolution: Iceland becomes the first nation to recognize the independence of the Baltic states. It is followed by the U.S. on September 2 and the Soviet Union on September 6.
- August 23 – Dissolution of the Soviet Union: Russia restores the white-blue-red tricolour as its national flag.
- August 24 – Dissolution of the Soviet Union: Ukraine declares independence, followed by Belarus the next day, from the Soviet Union.
- August 25
  - Dissolution of Yugoslavia: Serbian forces begin an attack on the Croatian town of Vukovar.
  - Linus Torvalds posts messages to the Usenet newsgroup comp.os.minix, regarding the new operating system kernel he has developed, called Linux.
  - Michael Schumacher, regarded as one of the greatest Formula One drivers in history, makes his Formula One debut at the Belgian Grand Prix.
- August 29 – Lebanon hostage crisis: Maronite general Michel Aoun leaves Lebanon on a French warship into exile.
- August 30 – Dissolution of the Soviet Union: Moldova declares independence from the Soviet Union, followed by Azerbaijan.
- August 31 – Dissolution of the Soviet Union: Kyrgyzstan and Uzbekistan declare their independence; Tajikistan follows suit on September 9.

=== September ===
Map of the three Baltic states, in their flag colours.

- September 3 – In Hamlet, North Carolina, a grease fire breaks out at the Imperial Foods chicken processing plant, killing 25 people.
- September 4 – Sverdlovsk's name is restored to its pre-communist–era name Yekaterinburg. Two days later, Leningrad is renamed St. Petersburg.
- September 5 – Dissolution of the Soviet Union: The Congress of People's Deputies of the Soviet Union self-dissolves, being replaced by Supreme Soviet of the Soviet Union and State Council of the Soviet Union.
- September 8 – Dissolution of Yugoslavia: The Republic of Macedonia becomes independent, beginning a name dispute with Greece.
- September 11
  - Lebanon hostage crisis: Israel releases 51 Arab prisoners and the bodies of nine guerrillas, paving the way for the release of the last western hostages in Lebanon.
  - The Soviet Union announces plans to withdraw military and economic aid to Cuba.
- September 15 – In the Swedish general election, the Social Democrats suffer their worst election results in 60 years, leading to the resignation of Prime Minister Ingvar Carlsson.
- September 17
  - North Korea, South Korea, Estonia, Latvia, Lithuania, the Marshall Islands, and Micronesia join the UN.
  - Home Improvement premieres on ABC.
- September 19 – Ötzi the Iceman is found in the Alps.
- September 21 – Dissolution of the Soviet Union: Armenia declares independence from the Soviet Union. Nearly a month later on October 27, Turkmenistan declares its independence. Kazakhstan follows suit on December 16.
- September 21 – 30 – Iraq disarmament crisis: IAEA inspectors discover files on Iraq's hidden nuclear weapons program. Iraqi officials refuse to let them leave with the documents, prompting a standoff that continues until the UN Security Council threatens enforcement actions on Iraq.
- September 22 – The Huntington Library makes the Dead Sea Scrolls available to the public for the first time.
- September 24 – Lebanon hostage crisis: Lebanese kidnappers release Jackie Mann after more than two years of captivity.
- September 25 – Salvadoran Civil War: Representatives of the Farabundo Martí National Liberation Front reach an agreement with President of El Salvador Alfredo Cristiani, setting the stage for the end of the war.
- September 27 – U.S. president George H. W. Bush announces unilateral reductions in short-range nuclear weapons and calls off 24-hour alerts for long-range bombers. The Soviet Union responds with similar unilateral reductions on October 5.
- September 29 – Salvadoran Civil War: An army colonel of the Atlácatl Battalion is found guilty of the 1989 murders of six Jesuits.

=== October ===
- October 1 – Dissolution of Yugoslavia: Forces of the Yugoslav People's Army surround Dubrovnik, beginning the Siege of Dubrovnik, which lasts until May 31, 1992.
- October 3–November 2 – The 1991 Rugby World Cup takes place in the United Kingdom, Republic of Ireland and France and is won by Australia who beat England in the final.
- October 3 – Speaker of the U.S. House of Representatives Tom Foley announces the closure of the House Bank by the end of the year after revelations that House members have written numerous bad checks.
- October 4 – Carl Bildt succeeds Ingvar Carlsson as Prime Minister of Sweden.
- October 6 – President Gorbachev condemns antisemitism in the Soviet Union in a statement read on the 50th anniversary of the Babi Yar massacres, which saw the death of 35,000 Jews in Ukraine during WWII.
- October 7 – Dissolution of Yugoslavia: The Yugoslav Air Force bombs the office of Croatian President Franjo Tuđman, causing the Croatian Parliament to cut all remaining ties with Yugoslavia the following day.
- October 11
  - In the Russian SFSR, the KGB is replaced by the SVR, with the KGB officially ending operations on November 6.
  - Iraq disarmament crisis: The UN Security Council passes Resolution 715, demanding that Iraq "accept unconditionally the inspectors and all other personnel designated by the Special Commission." Iraq rejects the resolution, calling it "unlawful".
- October 12 – Askar Akayev is confirmed as the first president of Kyrgyzstan in an uncontested poll.
- October 13 – In the Bulgarian parliamentary election, the Union of Democratic Forces defeats the Bulgarian Socialist Party, leaving no remaining Communist governments in Eastern Europe.
- October 15
  - Clarence Thomas is confirmed as the new U.S. Supreme Court Justice following Thurgood Marshall's retirement.
  - The leaders of the Baltic States—Arnold Rüütel of Estonia, Anatolijs Gorbunovs of Latvia, and the Vytautas Landsbergis of Lithuania—sign the OSCE Final Act in Helsinki, Finland.
  - The Oh-My-God particle, the highest energy cosmic ray ever recorded, is detected.
- October 16 – Luby's shooting: 23 people are killed at a Luby's restaurant in Killeen, Texas after George Hennard drives his truck through the establishment and begins firing at diners. It becomes the deadliest mass shooting in U.S. history and wouldn't be surpassed until the Virginia Tech shooting.
- October 18 – The Soviet Union restores its diplomatic relations with Israel, which have been suspended since the 1967 Six-Day War.
- October 20
  - The Harare Declaration is signed in Harare, Zimbabwe, laying down the Commonwealth of Nations membership criteria.
  - A large suburban firestorm centered in Oakland Hills, California, kills 25 people and injures 150 others.
  - A 6.8 M_{w} earthquake strikes Uttarkashi, India, killing at least 768 people and destroying thousands of homes.
- October 21 – Lebanon hostage crisis: Jesse Turner, a mathematics professor who has been held hostage for more than four years, is released.
- October 23 – In Paris, the Vietnam-backed government of the state of Cambodia signs an agreement with the Khmer Rouge to end the civil war and bring the Khmer Rouge into power despite its role in the Cambodian genocide. The deal ends the Cambodian–Vietnamese War and results in the creation of the UN Transitional Authority in Cambodia.
- October 27 – The first free parliamentary elections in Poland since 1928 are held.
- October 28–November 4 – The 1991 Perfect Storm strikes the northeastern U.S. coast and Atlantic Canada, causing over US$200 million of damage and resulting in 12 direct fatalities.
- October 29 – NASA's Galileo spacecraft makes its closest approach to 951 Gaspra, becoming the first probe to visit an asteroid.
- October 31–November 3 – The Halloween blizzard hits the U.S. Upper Midwest, killing 22 people and causing US$100 million in damage.

=== November ===
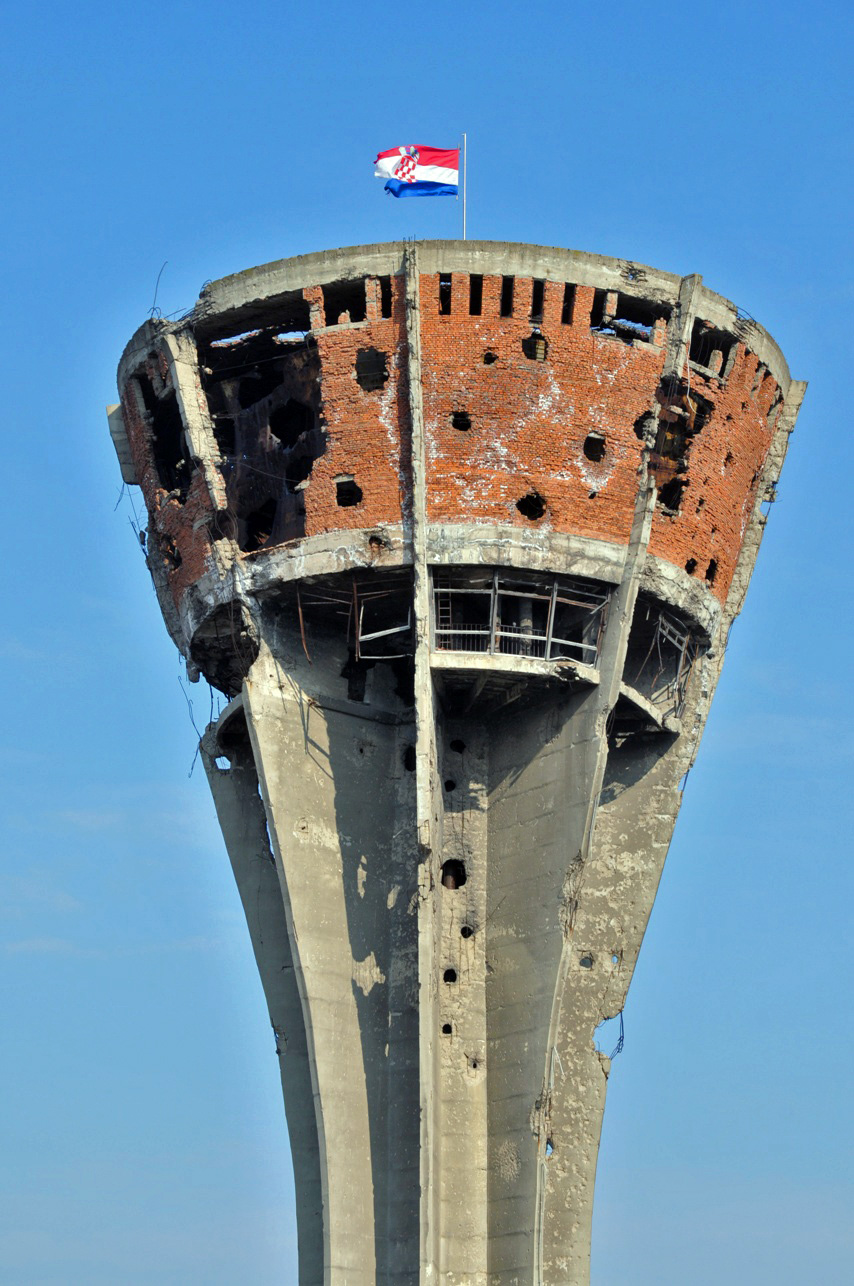
Symbol of Vukovar; Croatian War of Independence

- November 2 – Bartholomew I is enthroned as Patriarch of the Ecumenical Patriarchate of Constantinople, thus becoming the new spiritual leader of the Eastern Orthodox worldwide.
- November 4–5 – End of Apartheid: The African National Congress leads a general strike, demanding representation in the government and an end to the value-added tax.
- November 5
  - Tropical Storm Thelma causes flash floods in the Philippine city of Ormoc, killing more than 4,900 people.
  - China and Vietnam restore diplomatic relations after a 13-year rift which followed the 1979 Sino-Vietnamese War.
- November 6 – The CPSU and its republic-level division, the Communist Party of the Russian SFSR, are banned in the Russian SFSR by presidential decree.
- November 7 – The first report on carbon nanotubes is published by Sumio Iijima in Nature.
- November 9 – The British JET fusion reactor generates 1.5 MW output power.
- November 14
  - American and British authorities announce indictments against two Libyan intelligence officials in connection with the downing of the Pan Am Flight 103 over Britain in 1988.
  - Cambodian Prince Norodom Sihanouk returns to Phnom Penh after 13 years of exile.
- November 18
  - Lebanon hostage crisis: Kidnappers in Lebanon set Anglican Church envoy Terry Waite and academic Thomas Sutherland free.
  - Dissolution of Yugoslavia: The forces of the Yugoslav People's Army (JNA) and Serb paramilitaries take the Croatian town of Vukovar after the 87-day Battle of Vukovar. They kill more than 260 Croatian prisoners of war.
- November 20 – An Azerbaijani Mil Mi-8 helicopter carrying a 19-member peacekeeping mission team is shot down by Armenian military forces in Khojavend District, Azerbaijan.
- November 21 – The UN Security Council recommends Egypt's deputy prime minister Boutros Boutros-Ghali to be the next Secretary-General of the UN.
- November 23 – Members of the Communist Party of Great Britain vote to dissolve the party and found the think-tank Democratic Left in its place.
- November 24 – Queen lead singer Freddie Mercury dies in London from AIDS induced pneumonia. In an unrelated incident, Kiss drummer Eric Carr dies from heart cancer.
- November 26
  - The National Assembly of Azerbaijan abolishes the autonomous status of the Nagorno-Karabakh Autonomous Oblast and renames several cities to their Azeri names.
  - Michael Jackson releases Dangerous, selling 5 million copies in the first week.
- November 27 – Dissolution of Yugoslavia: The UN Security Council unanimously adopts a resolution opening the way to the establishment of peacekeeping operations in Yugoslavia.

=== December ===
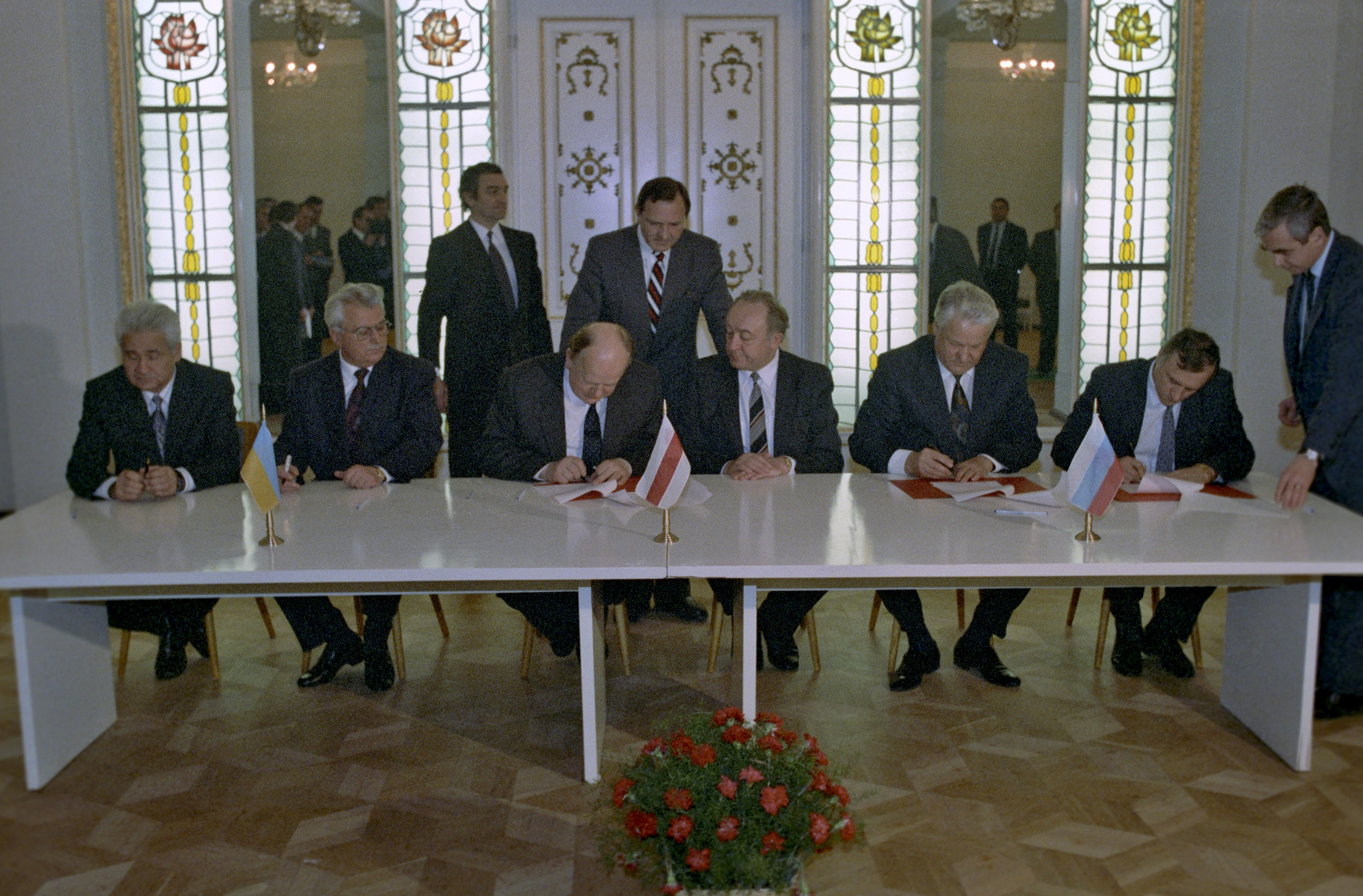
December 8: The signing of the agreement effectively ending the Soviet Union and the founding of the Commonwealth of Independent States.

- December 1 – Dissolution of the Soviet Union: Ukrainians vote overwhelmingly for independence from the Soviet Union in a referendum.
- December 4
  - Lebanon hostage crisis: Journalist Terry A. Anderson is released after seven years of captivity as a hostage in Beirut – the last and longest-held American hostage in Lebanon.
  - John Leonard Orr, one of the most prolific serial arsonists of the 20th century, is arrested in California.
  - Pan Am is officially dissolved after 64 years of operation
- December 8 – Dissolution of the Soviet Union: In the Białowieża Forest Nature Reserve in Belarus, the leaders of Russia, Belarus, and Ukraine sign an agreement officially ending the Soviet Union and establishing the Commonwealth of Independent States (CIS) in its place.
- December 11 – Dissolution of Yugoslavia: Croatian forces kill 18 Serbs and one Hungarian in the village of Paulin Dvor, Croatia.
- December 12
  - The government of Nigeria moves the capital from Lagos to Abuja.
  - Ukraine becomes the first post-Soviet republic to decriminalize homosexuality.
- December 15 – The Egyptian ferry Salem Express sinks in the Red Sea, killing more than 450 people.
- December 16 – The UN General Assembly adopts UN General Assembly Resolution 46/86, repealing a previous resolution adopted in 1975 which had ruled that Zionism is a form of racism.
- December 19
  - Paul Keating defeats Bob Hawke in a Labor Party leadership ballot and consequently becomes the Prime Minister of Australia; he is sworn in the following day.
  - Skarnsund Bridge opens in Norway, becoming the world's longest cable-stayed bridge for two years with a span of 530 metres (1,739 ft).
- December 21 – The North Atlantic Cooperation Council (NAC-C) meets for the first time.
- December 22 – Armed opposition groups launch a military coup against President of Georgia Zviad Gamsakhurdia.
- December 24 – Dissolution of the Soviet Union: Russian SFSR President Boris Yeltsin sends a letter to UN Secretary-General Javier Pérez de Cuéllar, declaring that Russia will be the succeeding country to the collapsing Soviet Union in the United Nations.
- December 25
  - Dissolution of the Soviet Union: Mikhail Gorbachev resigns as president of the Soviet Union, from which most republics have already seceded, anticipating the dissolving of the 69-year-old state.
  - The Russian SFSR officially renames itself the Russian Federation.
- December 26 – Dissolution of the Soviet Union: The Supreme Soviet meets for the last time, formally dissolves the Soviet Union, and adjourns sine die, ending the Cold War. All remaining Soviet institutions eventually cease operation on December 31.

== Nobel Prizes ==

- Chemistry – Richard R. Ernst
- Economics – Ronald Coase
- Literature – Nadine Gordimer
- Peace – Aung San Suu Kyi
- Physics – Pierre-Gilles de Gennes
- Physiology or Medicine – Erwin Neher, Bert Sakmann
