= List of earthquakes in 1991 =

Earthquakes in 1991
Approximate epicenters of the earthquakes in 1991
- 4.0–5.9 magnitude
- 6.0–6.9 magnitude
- 7.0–7.9 magnitude
- 8.0+ magnitude
- Strongest magnitude: 7.6 M_{w} (Costa Rica) Costa Rica; 7.6 M_{w} Russia
- Deadliest: 6.8 M_{w} (India) India; 2,000 deaths
- Total fatalities: 3,498

Number by magnitude
- 9.0+: 0
- 4.0–4.9: 4,304

This is a list of earthquakes in 1991. Only earthquakes of magnitude 6 or above are included, unless they result in damage or casualties, or are notable for some other reason. All dates are listed according to UTC time.

== By death toll ==
Rank	Death toll	Magnitude	Location	MMI	Depth (km)	Date
1	2,000	6.8	India, Uttarakhand	IX (Violent)	10.3	October 19
2	848	6.9	Afghanistan, Badakshan	VII (Very Strong)	142.4	January 31
3	270	7.0	(Georgia (country)) Georgia, Racha	IX (Violent)	17.2	April 29
4	127	7.6	Costa Rica, Limon	X (Extreme)	10.0	April 22
5	92	5.3	Peru, Department of Arequipa	VI (Strong)	5.0	July 23
6	53	7.1	Peru, Department of San Martín	VIII (Severe)	19.8	April 5
7	25	6.2	Guatemala, Chimaltenango Department	VII (Very Strong)	5.0	September 18
8	23	6.9	East Timor offshore	VII (Very Strong)	28.8	July 4
9	20	5.5	Iraq, Kurdistan Region	VI (Strong)	25.5	July 24
10	10	4.7	Yemen, Ibb	V (Moderate)	10.0	November 22

Listed are earthquakes with at least 10 dead.

== By magnitude ==
Rank	Magnitude	Death toll	Location	MMI	Depth (km)	Date
1	7.6	127	Costa Rica, Limon Province	X (Extreme)	10.0	April 22
1	7.6	0	Russia, Kuril Islands offshore	VI (Strong)	24.7	December 22
3	7.5	0	Indonesia, Gorontalo offshore	VII (Very Strong)	31.4	June 20
4	7.3	0	Argentina, Santiago del Estero	I (Not Felt)	558.0	June 23
5	7.2	0	Solomon Islands, Malango offshore	VII (Very Strong)	23.4	October 14
5	7.2	2	Colombia, Chocó offshore	IX (Violent)	21.3	November 19
5	7.2	0	South Georgia and the South Sandwich Islands offshore	I (Not Felt)	10.0	December 27
8	7.1	53	Peru, San Martín	VIII (Severe)	19.8	April 5
9	7.0	0	Myanmar, Sagaing	VIII (Severe)	19.7	January 5
9	7.0	0	Philippines, Mindanao offshore	VII (Very Strong)	23.9	February 18
9	7.0	270	(Georgia (country)) Georgia, Racha-Lechkhumi and Kvemo Svaneti	IX (Violent)	17.2	April 29
9	7.0	0	Indonesia, Gorontalo offshore	VI (Strong)	33.0	May 19
9	7.0	0	Peru, Cusco	VII (Very Strong)	104.5	July 6
9	7.0	0	United States, offshore Alaska Peninsula	V (Moderate)	28.4	May 30
9	7.0	0	Tonga offshore	I (Not Felt)	265.5	June 9
9	7.0	0	United States, Oregon offshore	V (Moderate)	1.3	August 17
9	7.0	0	Fiji region offshore	I (Not Felt)	566.4	September 30

Listed are earthquakes with at least 7.0 magnitude.

== By month ==
=== January ===
January
- Strongest magnitude: 7.0 M_{w} Myanmar
- Deadliest: 6.9 M_{w} Afghanistan; 848 deaths
- Total fatalities: 848

Number by magnitude
- 8.0–8.9: 0
- 7.0–7.9: 1
- 6.0–6.9: 12

Date	Country and location	M_{w}	Depth (km)	MMI	Notes	Casualties	
Date	Country and location	M_{w}	Depth (km)	MMI	Notes	Dead	Injured
1	Mexico, Colima offshore, 172 km southwest of Emiliano Zapata	6.3	35.0	I	-	-	-
2	United States, Nevada, 6 km southwest of Carson City	4.4	5.8	V	Minor damage was caused in Carson City.	-	-
5	Myanmar, Mandalay, 99 km northwest of Mogok	7.0	19.7	VIII	At least 32 buildings and 380 hectares of farmland were damaged in Thabeikkyin. Some landslides were also reported.	-	-
23	United States, Alaska, Rat Islands offshore	6.4	108.4	V	-	-	-
25	Indonesia, Papua offshore, 162 km northwest of Abepura	6.4	33.0	VI	-	-	-
31	Afghanistan, Badakshan, 77 km northwest Parun	6.9	142.4	VII	The 1991 Hindu Kush earthquake killed 848 people (545 in Afghanistan, 300 in Pakistan and 3 in Tajikistan), injured 200 and destroyed thousands of homes. Landslides also occurred.	848	200

=== February ===
February
- Strongest magnitude: 7.0 M_{w} Philippines
- Deadliest: 3.8 M_{w} France; 9 deaths
- Total fatalities: 9

Number by magnitude
- 8.0–8.9: 0
- 7.0–7.9: 1
- 6.0–6.9: 11

Date	Country and location	M_{w}	Depth (km)	MMI	Notes	Casualties	
Date	Country and location	M_{w}	Depth (km)	MMI	Notes	Dead	Injured
9	Solomon Islands, Guadalcanal offshore, 68 km southwest of Malango	6.9	10.0	VI	Some damage occurred in Honiara, where a tsunami of 4 cm was observed.	-	-
12	Turkey, Istanbul offshore, 18 km southwest of Kinali	4.8	10.0	IV	A few people were slightly injured and minor damage occurred in the Istanbul area.	-	3+
13	France, Provence-Alpes-Côte d'Azur, 6 km south of Claviere, Italy	3.8	5.0	IV	Nine people were killed by an avalanche which was triggered by the quake.	9	-
18	Philippines, Caraga offshore, 18 km east of Aras-asan	7.0	23.9	VII	-	-	-
21	Russia, offshore Bering Sea	6.7	20.2	IV	A tsunami was observed with heights of 30 cm (1 ft) in Dutch Harbor, Alaska.	-	-
25	China, Xinjiang, 118 km southwest of Aykol	6.0	20.6	VII	Three people were injured and at least 120 houses collapsed and 8,441 houses damaged in the Kalpin area. Ground cracks were also reported there.	-	3

=== March ===
March
- Strongest magnitude: 6.6 M_{w} Russia
- Total fatalities: 0

Number by magnitude
- 8.0–8.9: 0
- 7.0–7.9: 0
- 6.0–6.9: 9

Date	Country and location	M_{w}	Depth (km)	MMI	Notes	Casualties	
Date	Country and location	M_{w}	Depth (km)	MMI	Notes	Dead	Injured
8	Russia, Kamchatka, 74 km northeast of Tilichiki	6.6	13.0	VIII	-	-	-
16	Costa Rica, Guanacaste, 15 km north of Nandayure	6.3	33.0	VI	-	-	-
25	China, Shanxi, 58 km southeast of Datong	5.4	10.0	VI	131 people were injured and 1,328 houses were damaged in Datong.	-	131

=== April ===
April
- Strongest magnitude: 7.6 M_{w} Costa Rica
- Deadliest: 7.0 M_{w} Georgia; 270 deaths
- Total fatalities: 452

Number by magnitude
- 8.0–8.9: 0
- 7.0–7.9: 3
- 6.0–6.9: 13

Date	Country and location	M_{w}	Depth (km)	MMI	Notes	Casualties	
Date	Country and location	M_{w}	Depth (km)	MMI	Notes	Dead	Injured
4	Peru, San Martín, 4 km northeast of Rioja	6.5	20.7	VII	This was a foreshock of the 7.1 earthquake which occurred a day later. Ten people were injured and fifteen houses were damaged.	-	10
5	Peru, San Martín, 11 km northeast of Rioja	7.1	19.8	VIII	The 1991 Alto Mayo earthquake killed at least 53 people, injured 252 and destroyed 8,063 homes in the Rioja-Moyobamba area.	53	252
5	Peru, Ica, 21 km southeast of Pampa de Tate	6.3	50.0	VI	Some damage was caused in Nazca.	-	-
6	(France) Wallis and Futuna offshore, 203 km southeast of Mata-Utu	6.7	16.0	I	-	-	-
18	Tajik Soviet Socialist Republic, Khatlon, 14 km southeast of Boshchorbogh	5.5	33.0	V	One person died and six were injured in the Kabodiyen District, where landslides occurred.	1	6
20	Afghanistan, Badakshan, 50 km south of Jurm	4.1	33.0	III	100 homes were damaged in Badakshan.	-	-
22	Costa Rica, Limón, 34 km south of Limón	7.6	10.0	X	The 1991 Limon earthquake claimed 48 lives in Costa Rica and 79 in Bocas del Toro, Panama. Roads and bridges between Limón and Sixaola were all destroyed. 759 people were also injured.	127	759
24	Turkey, Erzurum, 33 km west of Tekman	4.5	33.0	IV	One person was killed, three were injured and some houses were damaged in Erzurum Province.	1	3
29	Georgia, Racha, 22 km northwest of Java	7.0	17.2	IX	The 1991 Racha earthquake was the most powerful earthquake ever recorded in the Caucasus region. 270 people were killed and 1,000 were injured.	270	1,000

=== May ===
May
- Strongest magnitude: 7.0 M_{w} Indonesia; 7.0 M_{w} United States
- Deadliest: 5.6 M_{w} Georgia; 3 deaths
- Total fatalities: 4

Number by magnitude
- 8.0–8.9: 0
- 7.0–7.9: 2
- 6.0–6.9: 10

Date	Country and location	M_{w}	Depth (km)	MMI	Notes	Casualties	
Date	Country and location	M_{w}	Depth (km)	MMI	Notes	Dead	Injured
1	United States, Alaska, 33 km west of Petersville	6.3	115.1	V	Minor damage occurred in Anchorage.	-	-
3	Japan, Bonin Islands offshore	6.7	433.1	I	-	-	-
3	Georgia, Racha, 19 km northeast of Ambrolauri	5.6	10.0	VII	It was an aftershock of the 1991 Racha earthquake. Three people were killed by landslides.	3	-
4	Panama, Bocas del Toro offshore, 16 km northeast of Changuinola	6.2	10.0	VIII	36 people were injured and 900 people were left homeless in Changuinola.	-	36
15	Georgia, Racha, 7 km southwest of Oni	4.9	14.0	VI	A mudslide destroyed all 45 houses in the Khekheti area. It was an aftershock of the 1991 Racha earthquake.	-	-
17	Papua New Guinea, East Sepik, 22 km southwest of Ambunti	6.4	59.0	VI	-	-	-
19	Indonesia, Gorontalo offshore, 69 km north of Gorontalo	7.0	33.0	VI	-	-	-
21	Indonesia, Maluku offshore, 106 km north of Baukau, Timor Leste	6.6	18.4	VI	-	-	-
26	Malaysia, Sabah, 13 km southeast of Ranau	5.1	33.0	V	One person died of a heart attack and light damage occurred in Ranau.	1	-
30	United States, Alaska offshore, 71 km southeast of King Cove	7.0	28.4	V	-	-	-

=== June ===
June
- Strongest magnitude: 7.5 M_{w} Indonesia
- Deadliest: 6.3 M_{w} Georgia; 8 deaths
- Total fatalities: 10

Number by magnitude
- 8.0–8.9: 0
- 7.0–7.9: 3
- 6.0–6.9: 6

Date	Country and location	M_{w}	Depth (km)	MMI	Notes	Casualties	
Date	Country and location	M_{w}	Depth (km)	MMI	Notes	Dead	Injured
7	Indonesia, offshore Flores Sea, 160 km northeast of Maumere	6.9	536.4	I	-	-	-
9	Tonga, Tongatapu offshore, 144 km northwest of Nukuʻalofa	7.0	265.5	I	-	-	-
10	Northern Mid-Atlantic Ridge	6.4	9.7	I	-	-	-
15	Georgia, Racha, 9 km northeast of Java	6.3	9.4	VIII	It was an aftershock of the 1991 Racha earthquake. Eight people were killed, 200 were injured and further damage was caused.	8	200
15	South Georgia and the South Sandwich Islands offshore	6.6	51.7	I	-	-	-
20	Indonesia, Gorontalo offshore, 79 km northwest of Gorontalo	7.5	31.4	VII	Over 1,500 houses were damaged in Gorontalo.	-	-
23	Argentina, Santiago del Estero, 27 km northwest of El Hoyo	7.3	558.0	I	-	-	-
28	United States, California, 13 km northeast of Sierra Madre	5.8	8.0	VII	After the 1991 Sierra Madre earthquake, one person was killed and another died due to a heart attack. 100 people were injured and many buildings were damaged.	2	100

=== July ===
July
- Strongest magnitude: 7.0 M_{w} Peru
- Deadliest: 5.3 M_{w} Peru; 92 deaths
- Total fatalities: 137

Number by magnitude
- 8.0–8.9: 0
- 7.0–7.9: 1
- 6.0–6.9: 6

Date	Country and location	M_{w}	Depth (km)	MMI	Notes	Casualties	
Date	Country and location	M_{w}	Depth (km)	MMI	Notes	Dead	Injured
2	Indonesia, Sumatra offshore, 58 km southwest of Padang	6.4	53.8	V	Minor damage was caused in Padang.	-	-
4	East Timor offshore, 81 km northwest Maubara	6.9	28.8	VII	The 1991 Kalabahi earthquakes destroyed over 1,100 homes, killing 23 and injuring 181.	23	181
6	Peru, Cusco, 15 km west of Lares	7.0	104.5	VII	Some damage occurred in Cusco.	-	-
12	Romania, Timis, 2 km south of Livezile	5.6	10.7	VIII	Two people died and thirty were injured after several houses collapsed. Some damage was also caused in Serbia (formerly part of Yugoslavia).	2	30
13	United States, Oregon offshore, 103 km west of Pistol River	6.9	11.0	VI	-	-	-
14	Afghanistan, Badakshan, 53 km southwest of Ashkasham	6.7	212.9	V	-	-	-
23	Peru, Arequipa, 5 km southeast of Chivay	5.3	5.0	VI	At least 92 people were killed and thirty were injured in the earthquake despite its moderate magnitude, including eighty who were missing and presumed dead.	92	30
24	Iraq, Kurdistan, 30 km southeast of Aqrah	5.5	25.5	VI	At least twenty people killed and many were injured. 100 homes were destroyed.	20	Many

=== August ===
August
- Strongest magnitude: 7.0 M_{w} United States
- Total fatalities: 0

Number by magnitude
- 8.0–8.9: 0
- 7.0–7.9: 1
- 6.0–6.9: 8

Date	Country and location	M_{w}	Depth (km)	MMI	Notes	Casualties	
Date	Country and location	M_{w}	Depth (km)	MMI	Notes	Dead	Injured
6	Japan, Chiba offshore, 19 km east of Hasaki	6.0	28.5	V	-	-	-
8	Indonesia, Gorontalo offshore, 67 km northwest of Gorontalo	6.7	12.4	VII	It was an aftershock of the 7.5 earthquake that occurred in June.	-	-
14	Vanuatu, Torba offshore, 31 km north of Sola	6.5	13.8	VII	-	-	-
17	United States, California, 30 km southwest of Scotia	6.0	8.3	VIII	Damage and landslides occurred in Petrolia.	-	-
17	United States, Oregon offshore, 136 km southwest of Brookings	7.0	1.3	V	-	-	-

=== September ===
September
- Strongest magnitude: 7.0 M_{w} Fiji
- Deadliest: 6.2 M_{w} Guatemala; 25 deaths
- Total fatalities: 25

Number by magnitude
- 8.0–8.9: 0
- 7.0–7.9: 1
- 6.0–6.9: 6

Date	Country and location	M_{w}	Depth (km)	MMI	Notes	Casualties	
Date	Country and location	M_{w}	Depth (km)	MMI	Notes	Dead	Injured
18	Guatemala, Chimaltenago, 4 km southeast of Patzún	6.2	5.0	VII	During the 1991 Guatemala earthquake, 25 people died and 200 were injured. Landslides and extensive damage occurred.	25	200
28	Papua New Guinea, East New Britain, 95 km southeast of Kimbe	6.6	28.0	VI	-	-	-
30	Fiji region offshore	7.0	566.4	I	-	-	-

=== October ===
October
- Strongest magnitude: 7.2 M_{w} Solomon Islands
- Deadliest: 6.8 M_{w} India; 2,000 deaths
- Total fatalities: 2,000

Number by magnitude
- 8.0–8.9: 0
- 7.0–7.9: 1
- 6.0–6.9: 11

Date	Country and location	M_{w}	Depth (km)	MMI	Notes	Casualties	
Date	Country and location	M_{w}	Depth (km)	MMI	Notes	Dead	Injured
12	Vanuatu offshore, 96 km west of Sola	6.3	43.8	V	-	-	-
14	Solomon Islands offshore, 155 km west northwest of Malango	7.2	23.4	VII	-	-	-
18	Tonga offshore, south of the Fiji Islands	6.5	197.5	I	-	-	-
19	India, Uttarakhand, 32 km east of Uttarkashi	6.8	10.3	IX	The 1991 Uttarkashi earthquake damaged or destroyed 18,000 buildings throughout Uttarakhand, Chandigarh and New Delhi. Landslides and a 30-meter deep crack were formed in Uttarkashi. 2,000 people were killed and 1,800 were injured.	2,000	1,800

=== November ===
November
- Strongest magnitude: 7.2 M_{w} Colombia
- Deadliest: 4.7 M_{w} Yemen; 10 deaths
- Total fatalities: 13

Number by magnitude
- 8.0–8.9: 0
- 7.0–7.9: 1
- 6.0–6.9: 13

Date	Country and location	M_{w}	Depth (km)	MMI	Notes	Casualties	
Date	Country and location	M_{w}	Depth (km)	MMI	Notes	Dead	Injured
1	New Zealand, Kermadec Islands offshore	6.6	21.4	I	-	-	-
4	Iran, Khuzestan, 8 km northwest of Behbahan	5.6	38.5	V	51 people were injured and 290 houses were damaged or destroyed in Behbahan.	-	51
10	Iran, Khuzestan, 2 km southeast of Behbahan	5.0	43.6	IV	Fifteen people were injured and further damage was caused in Behbahan.	-	15
13	Philippines, Caraga offshore, 4 km southeast of Hinatuan	6.8	35.9	VII	Minor damage was caused.	-	-
19	Colombia, Chocó offshore, 33 km northwest of Santa Genoveva de Docordó	7.2	21.3	IX	Two people were killed and 28 homes were damaged in Chocó. Minor damage was also caused in Cali.	2	-
24	Yemen, Ibb, 7 km northwest of Dhi as Sufal	4.7	10.0	V	Ten people were killed and 39 were injured. 17 houses were destroyed and 87 damaged.	10	39
26	Japan, Hokkaido offshore, 33 km southeast of Shizunai-furukawachō	6.4	56.3	VI	-	-	-
28	Iran, Gilan, 26 km northeast of Manjil	5.6	15.7	VI	Damage occurred in the epicentral area. One person died and seventy were injured.	1	70

=== December ===
December
- Strongest magnitude: 7.6 M_{w} Russia
- Total fatalities: 0

Number by magnitude
- 8.0–8.9: 0
- 7.0–7.9: 2
- 6.0–6.9: 15

Date	Country and location	M_{w}	Depth (km)	MMI	Notes	Casualties	
Date	Country and location	M_{w}	Depth (km)	MMI	Notes	Dead	Injured
11	New Caledonia offshore, southeast of the Loyalty Islands	6.5	36.6	I	-	-	-
13	Russia, Kuril Islands offshore, 290 km east of Kuril'sk	6.6	30.0	I	These were foreshocks of the 7.6 earthquake on December 22.	-	-
13	Russia, Kuril Islands offshore, 258 km east of Kuril'sk	6.8	27.2	III	These were foreshocks of the 7.6 earthquake on December 22.	-	-
22	Russia, Kuril Islands offshore, 247 km east of Kuril'sk	7.6	24.7	VI	-	-	-
27	South Georgia and the South Sandwich Islands offshore	7.2	10.0	I	-	-	-
27	Mongolia, Khövsgöl, 64 km northeast of Kungurtug, Russia	6.4	13.5	VII	-	-	-
