= Syawa, India =

Syawa
- Village
- Location in Uttarakhand, India Syawa (India)
- Coordinates: 30.7397361°N 78.5958909°E
- Country: India
- State: Uttarakhand
- District: Uttarkashi district

Area
  - Total: 190.11 ha (469.8 acres)
- Elevation: 648 m (2,126 ft)

Population (2011)
  - Total: 475

Languages
  - Official: Hindi
- Time zone: UTC+5:30 (IST)

Syawa is a village located in the mountainous region of Uttarakhand, India.

== Population and demographics ==
According to the 2011 census, the village contained a total of 475 people, with 233 (49%) males, and 242 (51%) females. There were 89 children and 386 adults.

== Location ==
Syawa is located about 35 km (22 mi) to the nearest town, Uttarkashi. It is nestled in the lower region of the Himalayas.

Syawa is administrated by a Sarpanch, who is the elected representative of the village.
