= Zemo Krikhi church =

Church in Ambrolauri Municipality, Georgia

Zemo Krikhi church of the Archangel
- ზემო კრიხის მთავარანგელოზის ეკლესია
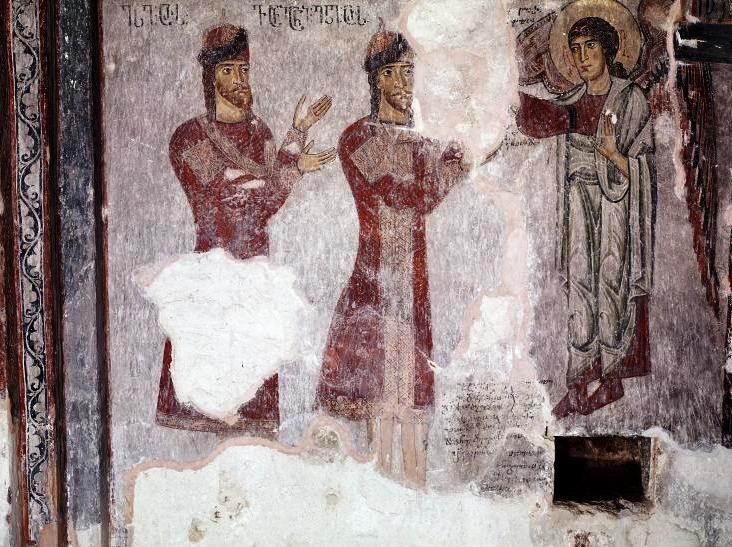
- Zemo Krikhi. Donor frescoes on north wall.
- Interactive map of Zemo Krikhi church of the Archangel
- Location: Zemo Krikhi, Ambrolauri Municipality, Racha-Lechkhumi and Kvemo Svaneti, Georgia
- Coordinates: 42.496856°N 43.193605°E
- Type: Hall church

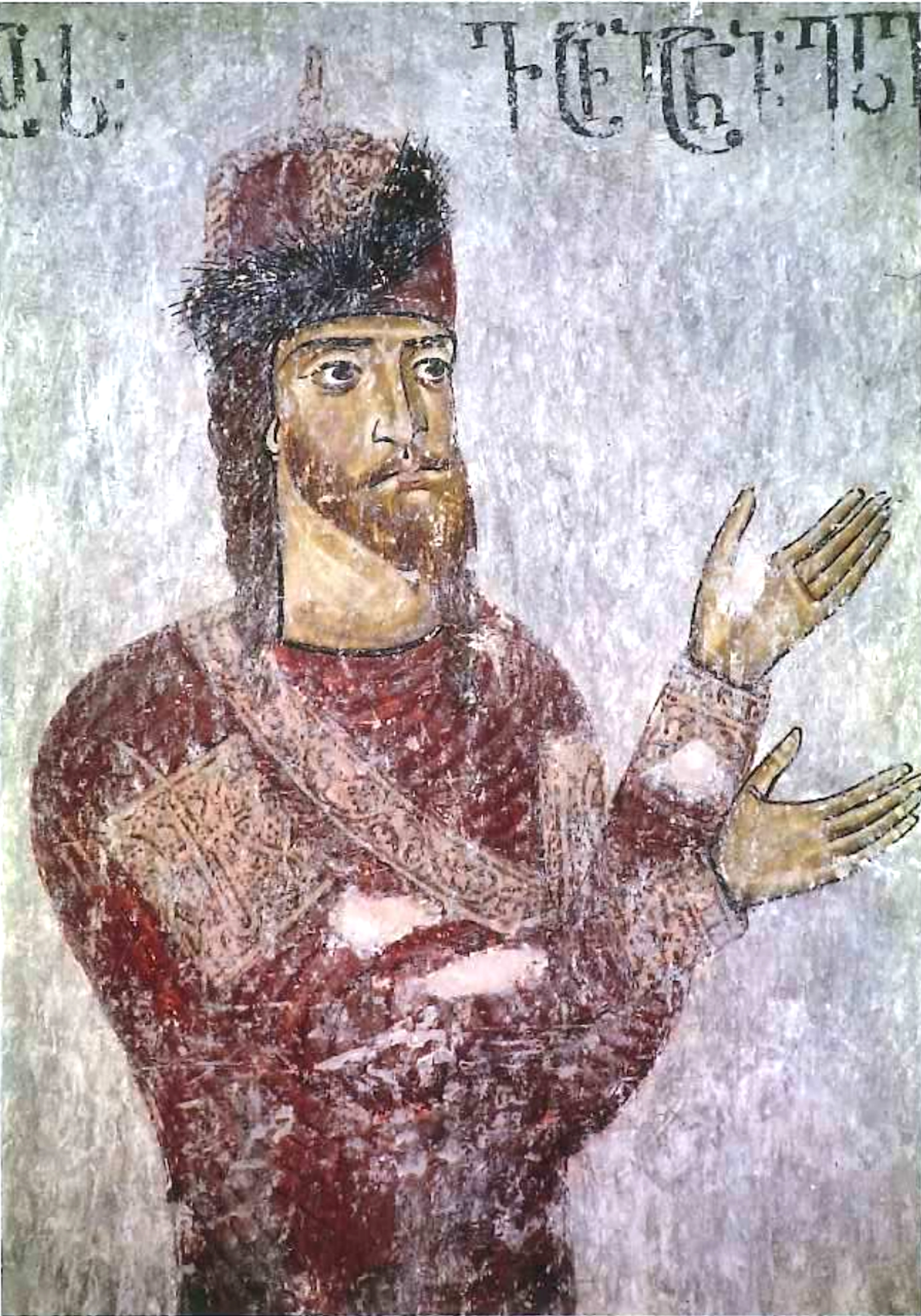
Donor figure wearing sharbush, qaba and tiraz. Church of the Archangels, Zemo-Krikhi, Racha, northern Georgia. 11th century, Inv. No. 03086-75.

The Zemo Krikhi church of the Archangel (Georgian: ზემო კრიხის მთავარანგელოზის ეკლესია, romanized: zemo k'rikhis mtavarangelozis ek'lesia) is a 10th–11th-century church in western Georgia, in the highland Ambrolauri Municipality, part of the historical and cultural region of Racha. It is a hall church with a projecting apse, adorned with stone carvings, frescoes, and medieval Georgian inscriptions. The church was almost completely destroyed in the Racha earthquake of 1991 and rebuilt in 2009. It is inscribed on the list of the Immovable Cultural Monuments of National Significance.

== History ==
The Zemo Krikhi church of Archangel Michael stands at the western outskirts of the village of Zemo Krikhi, Ambrolauri Municipality, in Georgia's northwestern Racha-Lechkhumi and Kvemo Svaneti. The building tops a hill on the left bank of the Krikhula, a tributary of the Rioni River. The area is part of the historical and cultural region of Racha. Based on architectural features, the Zemo Krikhi church is dated to the late 10th or early 11th century. Its first recorded mention occurs in the travel notes of the Russian envoys Tolochanov and Yevlyev, touring western Georgia in the 1650s, and Georgian donation charters of the 17th–18th century. The church collapsed in a major earthquake which hit Racha on 29 April 1991. It was rebuilt in 2009.

== Layout ==
The Zemo Krikhi church, measuring 13.4 × 5.7 m, is built of dressed stone blocks and lime. It is a hall church, with a projecting apse on the east. The apse has a pentagonal exterior and semicircular interior. On the south and west, the church has annexes, apparently special areas for women (sakalebo), built later in the 11th century. The western wall and the corresponding annex were remodeled in 1884. Unlike the standard tripartite sanctuary found in the contemporaneous hall churches in Georgia, the church has a bema divided into three parts: two deep and high conch-headed niches flank the altar on each side, making the interior appear monumental relative to its size. The bema is lit by two windows. The outer and inner walls of the church are richly decorated with ornamental stone carvings. The façades bear a dozen of inscriptions in the medieval Georgian asomtavruli and nuskhuri scripts, paleographically dated to the 11th century. The interior is adorned with the mid-11th-century frescoes. The paintings depict biblical scenes, portraits of various saints, including a group of female saints, clergymen, and secular donors.
