= 1990–91 Alto Mayo earthquakes =

Earthquakes in Peru

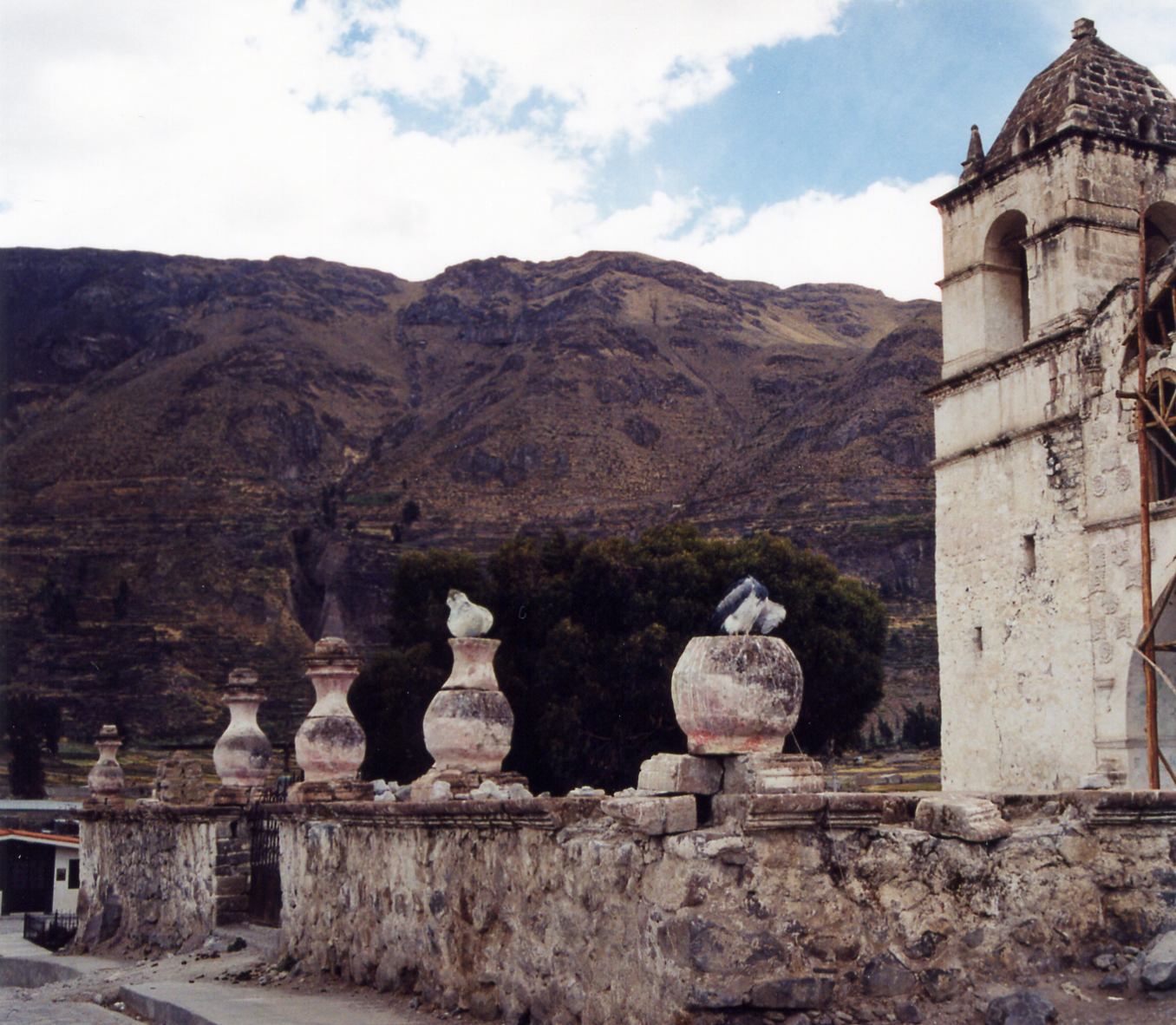
- A damaged church caused by the earthquake

- Location within Peru
- UTC time: 1990-05-30 02:34:05
- 1991-04-05 04:19:49
- ISC event: 370748
- 334433
- USGS-ANSS: ComCat
- ComCat
- Local date: 29 May 1990
- 5 April 1991
- Local time: 21:34
- 23:19
- Magnitude: M_{w} 6.5
- M_{w} 6.9
- Depth: 25.0 km (16 mi)
- 22.3 km (14 mi)
- Epicenter: 5.982°S 77.094°W
- Areas affected: Peru
- Max. intensity: MMI VIII (Severe)
- Casualties: 189 dead

Between May 1990 and April 1991, an earthquake sequence occurred in the Department of San Martín, northern Peru. Three large earthquakes of magnitudes (M_{w}) 6.5–6.9 occurred in the same region across 11 months, causing extensive damage. At least 189 people were killed in these earthquakes.

== Tectonic setting ==
Off the coast of Peru lies a 7,000 km (4,300 mi) convergent boundary where the oceanic Nazca plate subducts or dives beneath the continental South American plate. The Peru–Chile Trench marks the location where the two plates meet and converge. The rate of subduction at this boundary varies throughout its length; from 65 mm (2.6 in) per in the north, to 80 mm (3.1 in) per year in the south. The presence of active subduction produces large earthquakes when elastic energy along the plate boundary (megathrust) is released suddenly after decades or centuries of accumulated strain. Earthquakes rupturing the megathrust are known as megathrust earthquakes; capable of generating tsunamis when there is sufficient and sudden uplift of the seafloor, leading to the sudden displacement of the seawater.

Shallow inland crustal earthquakes within the overriding South American plate are caused by internal deformation of the crust within the Andes Mountains; formed by the ongoing convergence. It has been suggested that a large décollement beneath the range is the source of these earthquakes. The fold and thrust belt systems along the eastern foothills of the Andes are seismically active and produce thrust mechanism earthquakes. Normal and strike-slip mechanism earthquakes also occur within the shallow crust. Flat slab subduction beneath the Peruvian Andes also results in deformation of the South American plate, contributing to this occurrence.

== Earthquakes ==
These earthquakes located within the South American plate (~20 km (12 mi) depth) had magnitudes of 6.5, 6.4 and 6.9 and occurred on 30 May 1990 and 4–5 April 1991, respectively. The 1990 event ruptured along a reverse fault. The third and largest shock occurred as a result of strike-slip and reverse faulting. Its M_{w} 6.4 foreshock had a focal mechanism corresponding to reverse faulting. Geological faults in the Alto Mayo region mainly comprises steep-dipping imbricate thrust structures. Their dip angle decreases by the depth and represents a component of a fold and thrust belt.

While the highest Modified Mercalli intensity was VII (Very strong) in the area for the May 1990 event, localised soil liquefaction in Rioja, Moyobamba and Soritor were assigned VIII (Severe). Liquefaction also caused buildings to collapse. The May 1990 earthquake which occurred south of Alto Mayo ruptured the Pucatambo Fault while the April 1991 shock occurred on the Angaisa Fault to the north. The maximum Modified Mercalli intensity was observed in Soritor, while during the latter, was observed in Moyobamba and Yantaló.

== Impact ==
At least 9,277 homes were severely damaged by the earthquake of May 1990, and 135 people were killed. Majority of the structures that suffered damage were constructed from rammed earth and adobe, particularly in Rioja, Nuevo Cajamarca and Moyobamba. The town of Soritor was the most affected with 1,100 homes destroyed, or about 90 percent of the town. The collapse of homes killed many people living in them. At least 818 people across several jungle villages were injured, according to the country's civil defense force. In Moyobamba, there were at least 35 people dead while most of the deaths occurred in forested communities. Two air force aircraft were directed by President Alan García to visit the affected region, carrying 126 tons of relief items. Telecommunication and power services in the earthquake zone were disrupted. Dozens of fatalities were also recorded in Rioja, Nuevo Cajamarca and Soritor, respectively. Seventy-five people were also reported missing and 15,000 people became homeless.

An M_{w} 5.5 aftershock on June 9, 1990, caused one death and destroyed 14 homes. In April 1991, two more earthquakes separated by hours caused further damage in the region. The largest shock occurred on 5 April 1991; it killed approximately 53 people and left 252 others injured. It was preceded by a M_{w} 6.4 foreshock the previous day which left 15 injured and damaged 15 dwellings in Nueva Cajamarca and Rioja. Due to the foreshock occurring on the previous morning, most residents expected aftershocks and avoided sleeping in their homes before the nighttime mainshock occurred. About 3,080 homes in Moyobamba were damaged and in Soritor, 69 homes were affected but there was no casualties. Damage from the 1991 earthquake was greater compared to the 1990 shock but casualty numbers were lower. Most vulnerable structures in towns affected by the 1990 shock (Soritor, Havana, Moyobamba and Rioja) had been destroyed hence damage from the 1991 shock was comparatively smaller in these areas. The shock knocked out water, power and telephone services in several Amazonian towns. Deaths occurred in Moyobamba, Rioja and Nueva Cajamarca. At least 9,000 homes were damaged including some which were damaged by previous earthquakes. Seventy-eight schools, seven medical facilities and transport infrastructures were damaged. The civil defence responded by transporting corrugated metal sheets, medical supplies, food, tents and blankets among other items. The governments of Italy and Japan, and other aid groups contributed cash to the United Nations Disaster Relief Coordinator for the relief effort.

== See also ==
- List of earthquakes in 1990
- List of earthquakes in 1991
- List of earthquakes in Peru
