= Treaty of Asunción =

1991 treaty establishing a South American common market (Mercosur)

The Treaty of Asunción was a treaty between the countries of Argentina, Brazil, Paraguay, and Uruguay signed on March 26, 1991. The objective of the treaty, signed in Asunción, was to establish a common market among the participating countries, popularly called Mercosur (Southern Common Market). Later, the Treaty of Ouro Preto was signed to supplement the first treaty, establishing that the Treaty of Asunción was to be a legally and internationally recognized organization.

The treaty defined a program of gradual elimination of import/export fees that would reach a free commerce zone by the end of 1994. Even though the dates of the program were not followed and the free zone was not yet reached, the treaty established the basis for the "Mercado Común del Sur" (Mercosur).

== History ==
Since the Spanish American wars of independence, there have been various types of organizations and treaties with the intention of social and economic integration of South America. The Economic Commission of South America was created on February 25, 1948, to conduct studies aimed at the integration of these countries and increase the national markets and industrial development. The American Free Trade Association was created in 1960, with the same objective of regional integration, but during the 1970s, the asdo iation was unable to establish a common market among them. The South American countries could not compete with the international free markets, and the integration crisis worsened due to the 1973 oil crisis.

The Andean Pact, signed in 1969, integrated the markets of Bolivia, Colombia, Ecuador, Peru, and Chile, with Venezuela joining soon after, and Chile later becoming an observer. The Latin American Integration Association was created in 1989 to establish economic integration between Argentina, Brazil, Bolivia, Chile, Colombia, Ecuador, Mexico, Paraguay, Peru, and Venezuela. Brazil and Argentina signed the Treaty of Buenos Aires that was to establish economic integration between the two countries, and the Treaty of Asunción was signed to complement the Treaty of Buenos Aires, with Uruguay and Paraguay joining them.
