= Murder of Harry Collinson =

1991 murder of a planning officer

Murder of Henry ('Harry') Collinson
- Date: 20 June 1991
- Time: 9:00 AM
- Duration: 2 hours 20 minutes
- Location: Eliza Lane, Butsfield, County Durham, England; 54.806058°N 1.854791°W
- Cause: Property dispute
- First reporter: Tony Belmont
- Filmed by: Phil Dobson (for BBC Look North); Grant Atkinson and Michael Allun (for Derwentside District Council); Mike Peckett (for The Northern Echo)
- Deaths: 1
- Injuries: 2
- Accused: Albert Dryden
- Charges: Murder of Henry ('Harry') Collinson; Attempted murder of Tony Belmont, Stephen Campbell and Michael Dunston; Wounding with intent to cause grievous bodily harm
- Trial: 16 March – 1 April 1992
- Verdict: Guilty
- Sentence: Murder of Collinson: Life imprisonment; Attempted murder of Dunston: Life imprisonment; Wounding of Belmont: 7 years; Wounding of Campbell: 7 years
- Butsfield shown within County Durham

The murder of Henry ('Harry') Collinson, the planning officer for Derwentside District Council, occurred on 20 June 1991 at Butsfield, County Durham, England. At the time of the murder, Derwentside District Council was involved in a dispute with Albert Dryden, a local landowner, over the erection of a dwelling on his rural property without planning permission. At approximately 9:00 am on 20 June 1991, television news crews filmed as Dryden aimed a .455 Webley Mk VI revolver at Collinson and shot him dead. As the journalists and council staff fled, Dryden opened fire again, wounding BBC television reporter Tony Belmont and Police Constable Stephen Campbell.

A standoff situation followed as armed police officers—who had been on stand-by for the incident at nearby Consett—raced to the scene and Dryden retreated to a caravan on his property. Dryden warned them that the buildings were booby trapped with explosives, that he had planted land mines in the ground around the property and had a cache of hand grenades inside the caravan. At approximately 11:20, police negotiators offered to install a field telephone to enable them to better communicate with him. Dryden came out of the caravan to the perimeter fence to watch them and, realising that his holster was empty, tactical firearms officer Sgt John Taylor immediately wrestled him to the ground. Assisted by PCs Chris Barber, Andy Reay and Philip Brown, Taylor was able to subdue Dryden and he was taken into police custody.

Dryden was tried at Newcastle upon Tyne during March–April 1992. Found guilty of Collinson's murder, the attempted murder of council solicitor Michael Dunston—whom he had apparently been aiming for when he shot at the group—and the wounding of Belmont and Campbell, Dryden was sentenced to two terms of life imprisonment and two terms of seven years' imprisonment, to run concurrently. Dryden's appeal against the conviction was dismissed, and his applications for parole were refused as he showed no remorse for his crimes. In 2017, Dryden suffered a stroke and was released from prison to a nursing home on compassionate grounds. Dryden died on 15 September 2018 aged 78 in a care home following his prison release.

== Background ==
Albert Dryden was born on 12 May 1940 at Consett, County Durham, which was then one of the world's most prominent steel-making towns. He was the fifth of eight children born to Albert and Nora Dryden. His parents were fervent members of The Salvation Army, well liked and respected within the community, and lived with their family in a terraced house on Priestman Avenue, Consett. Dryden's father worked for the Consett Iron Company and was described by Police Sergeant David Blackie as "the epitome of a northern patriarch, a strict, clean-living man who did his best to bring up his children straight and true through the good times and bad."

Dryden was a solitary child with a very active imagination, often given to flights of fancy. He did not enjoy schooling and was not academic—IQ tests taken during adulthood would show that his intelligence was well below average. Dryden developed an early interest in weapons and firearms, and at age 11 purchased his first handgun—the unlicensed World War I Webley Mk VI revolver he later used to murder Collinson. Dryden paid 10 shillings (50 pence) for the gun—stolen by a schoolfriend from his father—and a single bullet. The lack of ammunition combined with the scarcity of, and difficulty obtaining, the correct cartridges would lead Dryden to manufacture his own ammunition. When Dryden murdered Collinson, he was using cartridges converted from .410 bore shotgun shells, loaded with heavier than usual cast lead bullets which Dryden called his "manstoppers".

== Murder ==
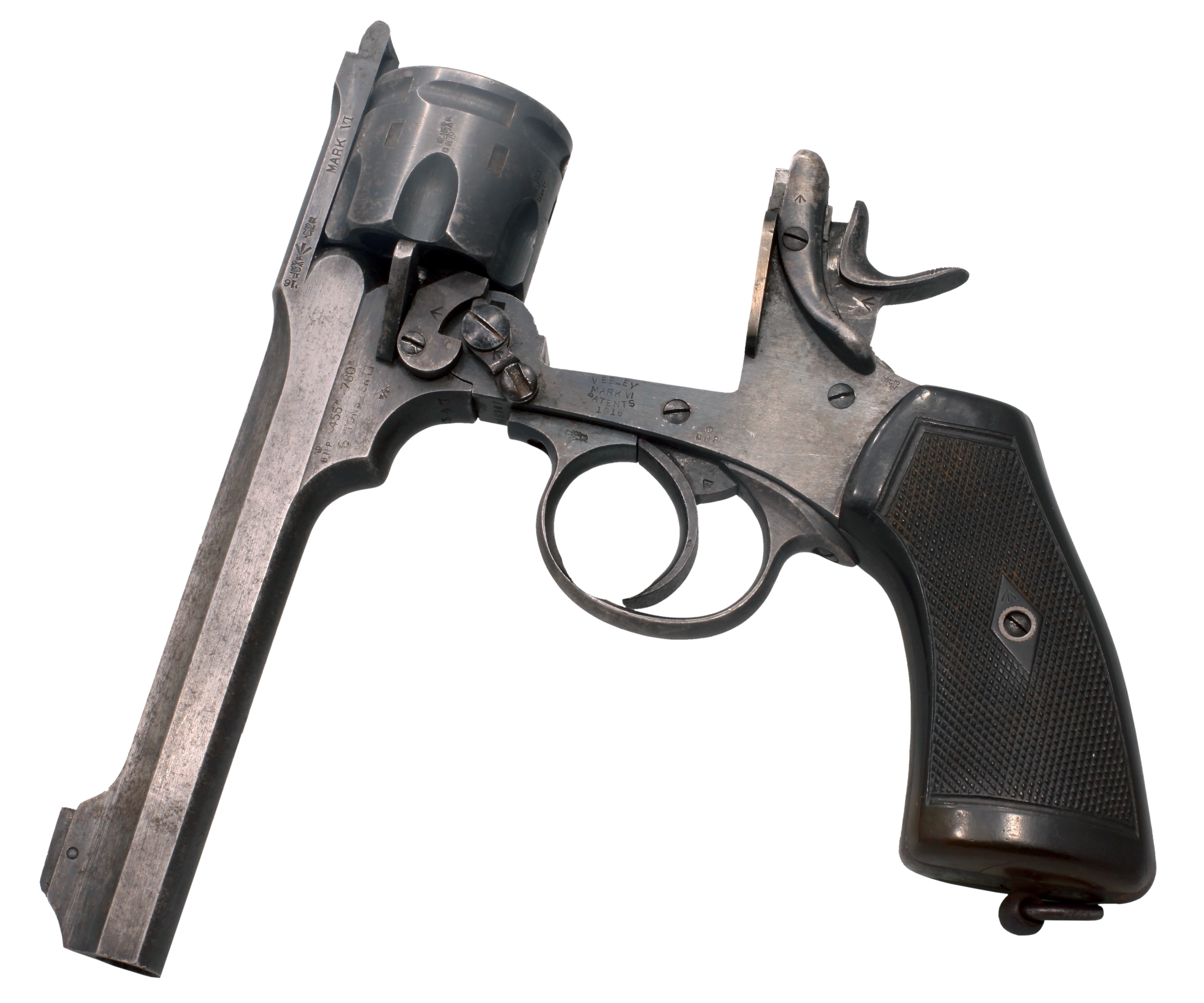
A top-break .455 calibre Webley Revolver of the type used by Dryden

The shooting took place at Dryden's rural property on Eliza Lane, Butsfield. During negotiations in front of a range of television and newspaper reporters, Dryden shot Collinson in the chest at point blank range. As the assembled reporters, council staff and three unarmed police officers—Sgt Colin Campbell, PC Stephen Campbell and PC Ian Kirkup of Durham Constabulary—fled for cover, Dryden climbed over the property's fence and shot Collinson again as he lay in a ditch where he had fallen. Dryden then opened fire on the fleeing group, hitting PC Campbell in the thigh and BBC North East reporter Tony Belmont in the arm. Seeing a police vehicle—carrying Superintendent Stan Hegarty and Inspector Geoff Young—approaching, Dryden shot at the vehicle, forcing it to reverse away at speed. He then reloaded and walked back to where the demolition vehicles were parked, firing twice into an excavator, twice into a low loader and once into a car. Dryden then returned to where Collinson lay and shot him again in the lower face and chest.

The incident was captured on camera and transmitted on the BBC's regional news programme Look North. The footage shows Collinson asking the camera crew to get a shot of Dryden's gun. The camera pans to Dryden, who fires the gun at Collinson (now off-screen). As everyone (including the television crew) disperses, Dryden shoots and wounds Campbell and Belmont. A fuller version of the footage, including a prior visit and the aftermath of the shooting, now forms part of the BBC's internal training course on filming safety.

A subsequent search of the property and Dryden's home in Consett uncovered ten handguns, fifteen rifles, three shotguns, two homemade mortars with eight projectiles, an improvised propane bomb and a 20mm cannon modified to be attached to one of his vehicles. Dryden had no firearms licence, and all the weapons were illegally held.

Following the murder, it became known that Collinson and Dryden had previously enjoyed a friendly relationship, with Collinson regularly visiting the Eliza Lane property to advise Dryden on planting trees for screening and what type of building work was permitted. However, Dryden's increasingly bizarre behaviour, his decision to dig a deep trench in which to build a bungalow with just the roof showing, and his threats towards—and physical assaults against—council staff brought the men into conflict. It was also revealed that the council had wanted to visit the site under cover of darkness to carry out the demolition, when Dryden would have been asleep at his home several miles away in Consett; Collinson disagreed with this underhand tactic and insisted that their actions should take place during the day and in the presence of the media to avoid any allegations of inappropriate conduct. Collinson also did not expect Dryden to back down, and arranged for a camera crew employed by the council to record the confrontation, which would allow the council to retreat without demolishing the building, instead passing the footage to the High Court to allow them to deal with the matter.

== Trial ==
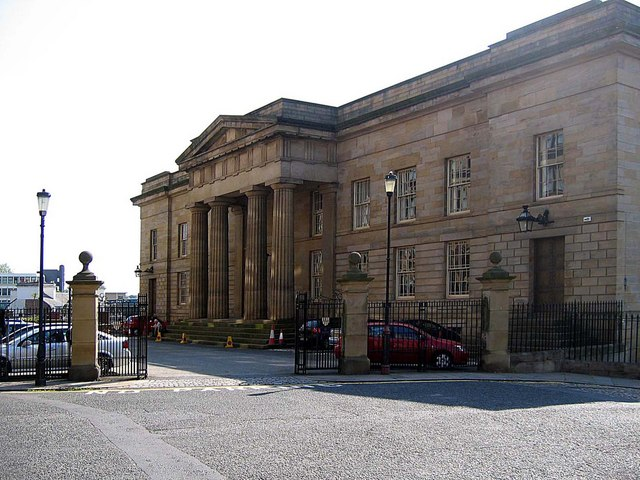
Moot Hall Crown Court, Newcastle upon Tyne

Dryden was tried at Newcastle upon Tyne Crown Court convened in the Moot Hall in March 1992, charged with murder; the attempted murder of Belmont, Campbell and council solicitor Michael Dunston; and an alternative charge of wounding Belmont and Campbell with intent to cause grievous bodily harm. Dryden entered pleas of not guilty to all charges on the grounds of diminished responsibility. After thirteen days of evidence, the jury took just two hours of deliberation before finding Dryden guilty of Collinson's murder, guilty of the attempted murder of Dunston, and guilty of wounding Belmont and Campbell. Dryden was sentenced to life imprisonment for the murder, life imprisonment for the attempted murder and two terms of seven years for the woundings, all to be served concurrently. Mrs Justice Ebsworth, sentencing, said: "The state of your mind on June 20 was abnormal, but not abnormal to the extent of diminishing your responsibility for what you did ... You are a dangerous man."

Dryden's appeal against his conviction was dismissed in February 1994. He also made four applications for parole, all of which were rejected as he showed no remorse for his crimes. While incarcerated, Dryden maintained that he had been the victim of a high-level Masonic conspiracy, and that Collinson had been a golfing partner of the Chief Constable of Durham Constabulary—despite Collinson being neither a Freemason nor a golfer. Described as "increasingly divorced from reality", Dryden also claimed that the prison authorities were attempting to poison him.

== Release ==
In 2017, Dryden suffered a severe stroke and was released from prison on compassionate grounds, to be cared for in a residential care home. Collinson's brother said: "Personally, I couldn’t bloody care less what happens to Albert Dryden. If he dies slowly, that's good. I'll be very happy about that. He never showed one bit of remorse in all the 26 years he has been in prison. He still tried to justify his actions. If the police had done their job properly, my brother wouldn't have been killed and Albert Dryden wouldn't have spent all this time in prison." Dryden died on 15 September 2018 aged 78 in a care home following his prison release.

== In popular culture ==
The 1992 album Bombed Out by Northeastern punk band the Angelic Upstarts included the song "Albert's Gotta Gun".

Death on a Summer's Day (John Hunt Publishing, 2006) by former police officer David Blackie recalls the incident as witnessed by him on the day.

== See also ==
- Marvin Heemeyer

== Citations ==
Bibliography

- Blackie, David (2006), Death on a Summer's Day: The true story of the murder Britain watched on live television, London: John Blake, ISBN 978-1-844-54190-4
