= Butsfield =

Village in County Durham, England

Coordinates: 54.803°N 1.824°W

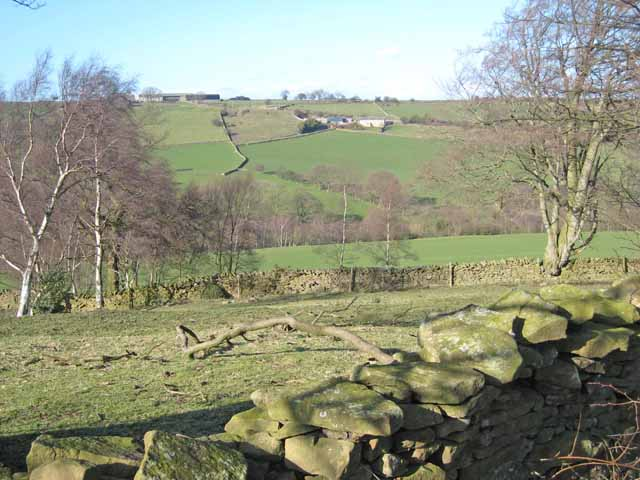
- Looking north across the valley of the River Browney to East Butsfield

- Location within County Durham
- OS grid reference: NZ113453
- Unitary authority: County Durham
- Ceremonial county: County Durham
- Region: North East
- Country: England
- Sovereign state: United Kingdom
- Post town: BISHOP AUCKLAND
- Postcode district: DL13
- Police: Durham
- Fire: County Durham and Darlington
- Ambulance: North East

Butsfield is a village in County Durham, England. It is situated a few miles to the south of Consett, near the village of Satley. Butsfield Burn Farm is the farm located at the centre of the Butsfield area.

== History ==
Butsfield had six farms in 1834, but mostly consisted of woodlands and "barren Fells."

Butsfield was the site of the murder of council officer Harry Collinson by Albert Dryden in June 1991.
