= 1991 Kalabahi earthquakes =

Earthquake in Indonesia

- Location within Indonesia
- UTC time: 1991-07-04 11:43:10
- ISC event: 324844
- USGS-ANSS: ComCat
- Local date: July 4, 1991
- Local time: 20:43
- Magnitude: 6.9 M_{w}
- Depth: 33.3 km (20.7 mi)
- Epicenter: 8.099°S 124.681°E
- Type: Reverse
- Areas affected: Alor Island, Indonesia
- Max. intensity: MMI VII (Very strong)
- Casualties: 23 fatalities

The 1991 Kalabahi earthquakes struck the sea adjacent to Timor on July 4, leaving twenty three people dead and injuring 181. The two quakes, which took place two-and-a-half seconds apart, measured 6.9 on the M_{w} scale.

== Geography ==
Kalabahi was the epicenter of the earthquake, 2,000 kilometres (1,243 mi) east from Jakarta, the Indonesian capital. With a calculated depth of 33.3 kilometres (21 mi), the earthquake was in the ocean between the Timor and Alor islands.

== Damage and casualties ==
The earthquake struck Timor with a magnitude of 6.9. The earthquake caused 3 fatalities on Alor alone, and 181 injuries. 1,150 buildings were destroyed and at least 5,400 civilians were left homeless.

Damage by the epicenter was estimated at 1991 US$7,700,000.
