= Malango, Solomon Islands =

Malango
- Ward
- Location in Solomon Islands
- Coordinates: 9°26′S 160°3′E
- Country: Solomon Islands
- Province: Guadalcanal
- Island: Guadalcanal

Population (2019)
  - Total: 15,560
- Time zone: UTC+11 (UTC)

Malango is a ward of Guadalcanal Province in Solomon Islands. It is a suburb of the nation's capital, Honiara, and directly borders the Capital Territory. Together with the Capital Territory and the neighboring ward of Tandai, they make up the Honiara Urban Area, the only metropolitan area of the Solomon Islands.

The ward contains Honiara International Airport.
