= 1991 Uttarkashi earthquake =

6.8 magnitude earthquake in India

- Location within India
- UTC time: 1991-10-19 21:23:14
- ISC event: 317038
- USGS-ANSS: ComCat
- Local date: 20 October 1991
- Local time: 02:53 Indian Standard Time (UTC+5:30)
- Duration: ~ 45 seconds
- Magnitude: 6.8 M_{w}
- Depth: 11.6 km (7 mi)
- Epicenter: 30.75°N 78.82°E
- Type: Reverse
- Areas affected: Uttar Pradesh; India
- Total damage: $60 million
- Max. intensity: MMI IX (Violent)
- Peak acceleration: 0.31 g
- Casualties: 768–2,000 dead 1,383–1,800 injured

The 1991 Uttarkashi earthquake (also known as the Garhwal earthquake) occurred at 02:53:16 Indian Standard Time (UTC+05:30) on 20 October with a moment magnitude of 6.8 and a maximum Mercalli intensity of IX (Violent). This thrust event was instrumentally recorded and occurred along the Main Central Thrust in the Uttarkashi and Gharwal regions of the Indian state of Uttarakhand (then still part of Uttar Pradesh). High intensity shaking resulted in the deaths of at least 768 people and the destruction of thousands of homes.

== Tectonic setting ==
The Garhwal division in northern India, flanked by the Tons River to the west and the Alaknanda River to the east, is located at the boundary of the Indian and Eurasian tectonic plates. In the region, the Indian plate is moving northeastward at a rate of 5 centimeters (2.0 in) per year. The Main Central Thrust is the primary northwest-striking structure and dips to the north at 30–40°. The fault plane solutions from the parametric catalogs for the 1991 and 1999 events showed low-angle thrust faulting with varying amounts of strike-slip movement.

== Earthquake ==
Six three-axis accelerometers that were within 60 km (37 mi) captured the event, including two units that were close to the projection of the fault at the surface. Analysis of the data recorded by these devices revealed the distribution of slip, moment release over time, and the location of the maximum slip. The mechanism of the event was typical of the thrust system of the Himalayas, with maximum slip (1.5 m (4 ft 11 in)) occurring to the west and southwest of the hypocenter. Energy release began slowly and built to a crescendo four seconds after the initiation of the rupture.

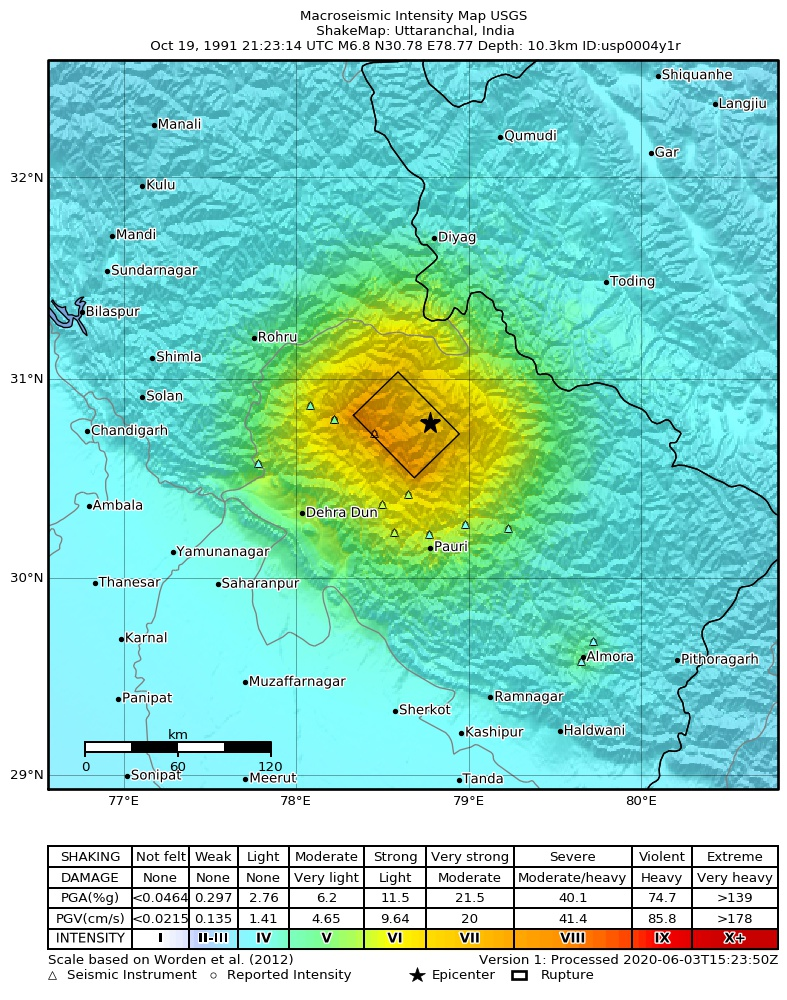
USGS ShakeMap for the event

=== Damage ===
Scientists from the Indian Institute of Technology Kanpur (IITK) conducted a survey of the affected areas between 27 October and 4 November. Their work revealed that more than 300,000 people in 1,294 villages were affected by the shock. Stone masonry homes (that usually supported heavy roofs) fared badly in areas where high intensity shaking occurred. The United States' National Geophysical Data Center indicates that 7,500 homes were damaged and another 7,500 were destroyed while the IITK report shows that up to 42,400 houses were damaged.

The United States' National Geophysical Data Center and the Belgian Centre for Research on the Epidemiology of Disasters' EM-DAT database both list 1,500 fatalities for the event with EM-DAT also listing 1,383 injuries. The USGS's Preliminary Determination of Epicenters and the Utsu catalog both list 2,000 deaths and 1,800 injured.

=== Intensity ===
Jain et al. 1992 stated that the shock was generally moderate while further clarifying the intensities that were observed at specific locations. Ghansyali, Gongotri, and Tehri were listed as experiencing intensity VII (Very strong) shaking and Bhatwari, Budhakedar, Krishanpur, Mahinanda, Maneri, and Uttarkashi were listed as experiencing intensity VIII (Severe) shaking. In a report that documented the study of strong motion recordings of the event, Jain & Das 1993 clarified that while Bhatwari and Uttarkashi experienced intensity VIII shaking at distances of 25 km (16 mi) and 40 km (25 mi) respectively, there was a small 20 km square mile area that experienced a maximum intensity of IX (Violent).

== See also ==
- List of earthquakes in 1991
- List of earthquakes in India
- 1999 Chamoli earthquake
- Tehri Dam
