= 1991 Hindu Kush earthquake =

Earthquake in Afghanistan

- Location within Afghanistan
- UTC time: 1991-01-31 23:03:33
- ISC event: 346020
- USGS-ANSS: ComCat
- Local date: 1 February 1991
- Local time: 03:33:33 AFT 04:03:33 PST
- Magnitude: M_{w} 6.8
- Depth: 143.2 km (89.0 mi)
- Epicenter: 35.911°N 70.478°E
- Type: Reverse
- Areas affected: Afghanistan, Pakistan, USSR (present-day Tajikistan)
- Max. intensity: MMI X (Extreme)
- Casualties: 729–1,303 dead

The 1991 Hindu Kush earthquake severely affected Afghanistan, Pakistan and the USSR (present-day Tajikistan) on 1 February. It was an intermediate-depth earthquake with a hypocenter 143.2 km (89.0 mi) beneath the Hindu Kush mountains in Afghanistan. The shock measured 6.8 on the moment magnitude scale and had a maximum Mercalli intensity of X (Extreme). The reverse-faulting earthquake occurred in a seismically active region associated with faulting within a deforming oceanic plate at depth.

The shaking was felt across parts of South Asia and the USSR. Hundreds of deaths were reported in Afghanistan and Pakistan, and damage was estimated at US $26 million. In Pakistan, 5,100 homes were destroyed and another 79,900 were damaged. Landslides were reported, some reportedly wiped out entire villages. In present-day Tajikistan, three people died of heart attacks.

== Geology ==
A concentration of intermediate-depth earthquakes have been observed beneath the Hindu Kush region around the Afghanistan-Pakistan-Tajikistan border region. Earthquakes with magnitude exceeding 7.0 have been frequently observed, such as ten events recorded between 1900 and 1950, and 1983, 1993, 2002 and 2015. Their high frequency was described by seismologists Beno Gutenberg and Charles Richter as "abnormal" in their 1954 publication; Seismicity of the Earth. These earthquakes originated from a deep fault within the stretching oceanic slab that subducted beneath the region. A 2016 study published in Geophysical Research Letters estimated an annual slip rate of 9.6 cm (3.8 in) on the fault to explain the ten to fifteen year recurrence intervals of M_{w} 7.0+ earthquakes. The study states that the subducted slab is vertically plunging into the Earth's deeper interior, causing it to stretch and eventually shear off. This process results in the high seismicity of the region.

== Earthquake ==
The earthquake occurred on 1 February, 1991, at 23:03:35 UTC. It measured M_{w} 6.8 and struck at a depth of 143.2 km (89.0 mi). Its epicenter was located in Takhar Province, 78 km (48 mi) northwest of Parun. Its focal mechanism solution corresponded to reverse faulting. Over 330 km (210 mi) away, at the Tarbela Dam, ground accelerations of 0.08–0.11 g were recorded by six of its eleven accelerometers located in various places around the dam. Damage in and Arandu, 145–160 km (90–99 mi) from the epicenter, the assigned Mercalli intensity was X (Extreme). Ayun, Drosh and Bajaur experienced intensity IX (Violent), while Mardan Division registered intensities of VII–VIII (Very Strong–Severe). In Peshawar, Kohat and Dera Ismail Khan Division, intensity VI (Strong) was assigned.

== Impact ==
According to OFDA and CRED, at least 545 people died in Afghanistan, while the state government issued a press release citing 1,000 deaths which was unconfirmed. The earthquake also killed 300 people and left 574 injured in the areas of Malakand, Chitral, and Peshawar, Pakistan. A reconnaissance survey of the area recorded only 181 deaths, attributing higher figures to heavy snow cover in the affected districts which hindered accessibility and lead to confusion and an overestimate by officials. People were killed in their sleep due to the earthquake occurring early in the morning. The high death toll was attributed to the collapse of poorly constructed homes when its residents were asleep. Additionally, three people died from heart attacks in the Khorog area, Tajikistan. The total damage in Afghanistan and Pakistan was estimated at US$26 and US$10 million, respectively. Large landslides occurred in Dir and Kohistan, and 5,302 cattle perished.

In Pakistan, damage was mainly concentrated near the border with Afghanistan, in a remote tribal region, and ninety percent of reported damage was in Malakand Division. At least 5,187 homes were razed while nearly 80,000 sustained damage. Several villages were totally buried under landslides, and some 300 homes in the mountainous village of Arandu were destroyed. Most homes in the area were constructed of straw and mud, which were razed. Doctors in Lahore said that at least ten people experienced heart attacks. Some homes located up to 644 km (400 mi) from the epicenter were also destroyed. Landslides, damage to communications, power, transportation, and some residential infrastructure occurred in Tajikistan. The shaking was also felt in parts of central Asia, India and Uzbekistan.

In Chitral, 145–150 km (90–93 mi) from the epicenter, twenty percent of pucca construction in the city sustained non-structural damage. Older homes sustained particular destruction. An 18 m (59 ft) tall minaret of the city mosque collapsed. Ninety percent of kutcha (Note: A temporary dwelling common in rural areas constructed of leaves, mud, wood, stones, thatch and unburnt bricks.) homes were damaged. In Ayun, there were many landslides. Most of its kutcha housing was damaged, and many Afghan refugee shelters were affected. In Islamabad, windows rattled for a minute, causing panic among inhabitants. Older and poorly constructed homes Islamabad and Lahore areas also sustained damage.

== Aftermath ==
In the immediate aftermath, many local governments were financially incapable of providing support. State funding was also not readily available as the earthquake occurred during a bank holiday. District and division officials maintained contact, however, the districts of Chitral, Dir and Kohistan were not immediately accessible due to snow cover. Local residents conducted their own immediate rescue efforts. They also used their personal funds to provide food and shelter for the displaced. The districts of Swat and Buner were the first to be supplied with aid, more than 24 hours after the earthquake. Rescue works were further hampered by poor weather conditions in remote areas.

On 2 February, Pakistan's prime minister visited the devastated districts of Bajaur and Chitral where he pledged the allocation of Rs 20,000 (US$840) for each deceased individual and Rs 25,000 (US$1050) per family for reconstructing homes. The United Nations Disaster Relief Organization reported on 3 February; the Pakistan government supplied blankets, shelter and medicine. To facilitate relief and rescue efforts, the government formed provincial-level emergency parties which provided details about the damage and casualties. Some non-governmental organisations and state governments provided blankets, shelters and medical supplies. The governments of Japan, Saudi Arabia and United Kingdom made large contributions of these items which were in shortage during the immediate disaster aftermath. Monetary support also came from the governments of Australia, Denmark, the Netherlands and United States, and the Kuwait Red Crescent. The city of Peshawar served as a storage area for supplies before they were distributed across the affected locales.

== See also ==
- List of earthquakes in Afghanistan
- List of earthquakes in Pakistan
