= Alto Mayo Protection Forest =

Protected area in Peru

- Bosque de Protección Alto Mayo
- IUCN category VI (protected area with sustainable use of natural resources)
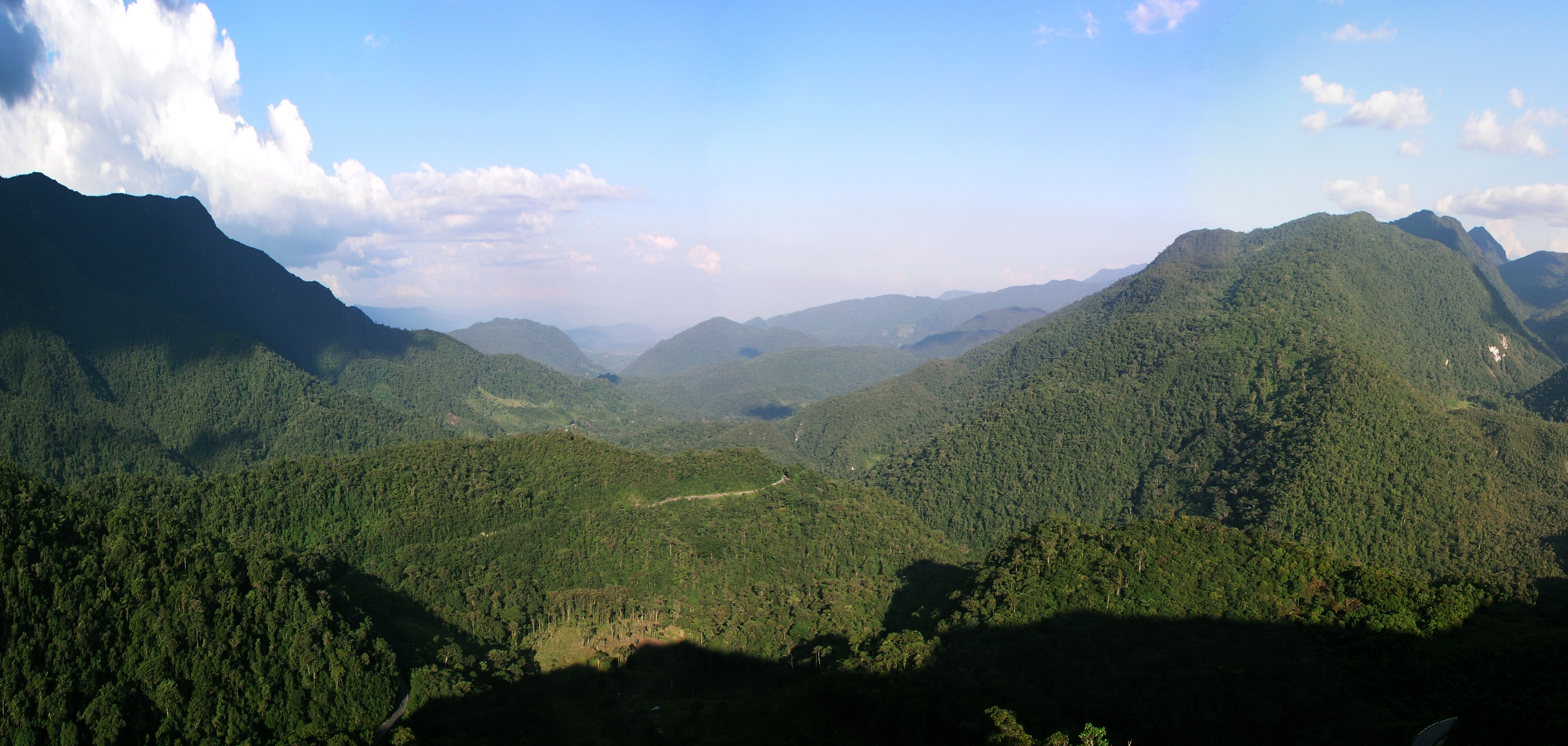
- Alto Mayo Forest viewed from the Abra Patricia pass.

- Location within Peru
- Location: Peru; San Martin and Amazonas
- Coordinates: 5°38′35″S 77°42′00″W
- Area: 1,820 km^{2} (700 sq mi; 182,000 ha)
- Established: July 23, 1987
- Governing body: SERNANP

The Alto Mayo Protection Forest (Spanish: Bosque de Protección Alto Mayo) is an area of protected forest land in northern Peru. It is located in Rioja and Moyobamba provinces within the region of San Martin, with a small part in Rodriguez de Mendoza province, in the region of Amazonas. This area preserves a portion of the tropical yungas forest in the upper Mayo River basin, while protecting soil and water from erosion by deforestation, as the area is the water supply of populations in the Mayo valley.

== History ==
In 1963, the Peruvian government granted protection over the area, declaring it the Alto Mayo National Forest by Law No 442; however, in the 1970s, many people started to occupy the area and clear the pristine forests. Also, workers who built a road across the national forest began to hunt the yellow-tailed woolly monkey for its meat. The government tried to control the situation by modifying the original law, declaring only the forests in the upper part of the valley to be under protection; the rest of the former national forest was declared land for free agricultural use.

The rediscovery of the yellow-tailed woolly monkey in 1974 in nearby areas attracted efforts of research and conservation to the national forest.

In 1977, the local office of the Ministry of Agriculture attempted to establish boundaries and a protection category for the forest, but the initiative was forgotten.

In 1979, a main road connecting the eastern forest lands with the Pacific coast (Carretera Marginal de la Selva) was opened. The same year, another free use zone was declared on land proposed for conservation within the national forest.

Between 1974 and 1983, several research projects on local fauna and forest ecology were conducted, all reaching the conclusion that the area should be given conservation priority.

The initiative for park delimitation and protection was resumed in 1984; the forest was protected by decree in 1987.

== Geography ==
The protected area covers 1,820 square kilometres (450,000 acres) of forest land along the upper River Mayo basin. The protected area also covers part of Moyobamba district within the province of Moyobamba; Rioja, Elias Soplin Vargas, Nueva Cajamarca, Awajun and Pardo Miguel districts within the province of Rioja; and a small part of the Vista Alegre district, within the province of Rodriguez de Mendoza, in the neighboring region of Amazonas.

This is a mountainous area, as it is located in the eastern part of the Andes, featuring slope grades greater than 70% in some parts.

The area and its surroundings are part of the river Mayo upper watershed and eleven of the Mayo's main tributaries originate within the Alto Mayo Protected Forest.

== Ecology ==
The Alto Mayo Protection Forest protects part of the Peruvian Yungas ecoregion.

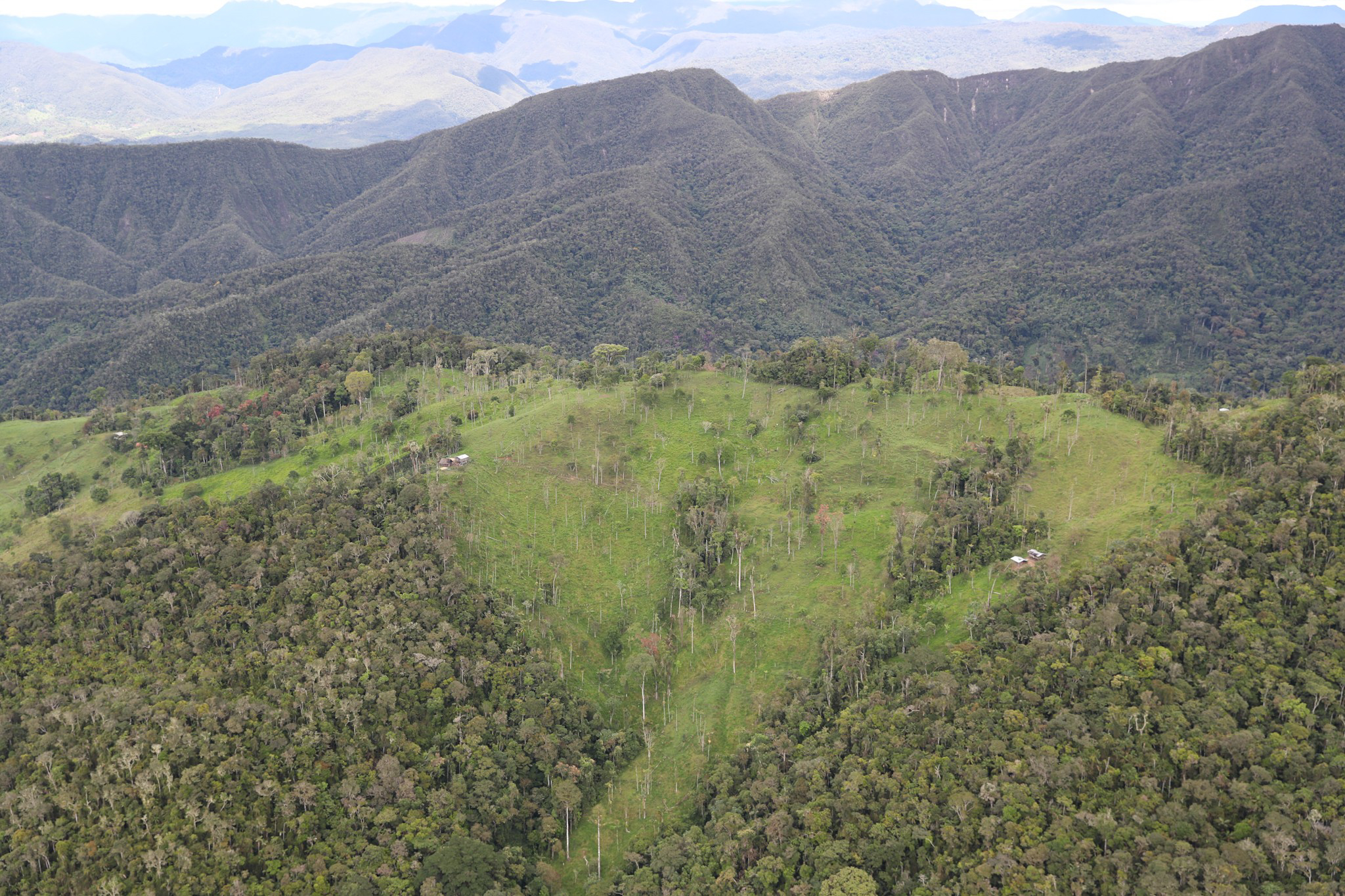
Deforestation at Alto Mayo Protection Forest.

=== Fauna ===
Some of the mammals reported in the area are the yellow-tailed woolly monkey, the spectacled bear, the cougar, the Peruvian night monkey, the Rio Mayo titi and the giant armadillo.

Birds reported in the protection forest are the Andean cock-of-the-rock, the oilbird, the king vulture, the equatorial greytail, the long-whiskered owlet, the swallow-tailed kite, the razor-billed curassow, the Andean guan, the speckled chachalaca, the blue-grey tanager, the white-throated toucan, etc.

=== Flora ===
Among the plant species found in the protected area are trees like cedro (Cedrela odorata), requia (Guarea trichilioides), rifari (Miconia longifolia), ojé (Ficus insipida), cetico (Cecropia sp.), uvilla (Pourouma cecropiifolia), tornillo (Cedrelinga cateniformis), cascarilla (Cinchona pubescens), palo seco (Alseis peruviana), huamansamana (Dipteryx alata), amasisa (Erythrina fusca), quinilla (Manilkara bidentata), marupa (Simarouba amara), yurac ciprana (Guatteria hyposericea), zapote (Quararibea cordata), guayacán (Tabebuia ochracea), catahua (Hura crepitans), mashonaste (Clarisia racemosa), moena negra (Ocotea sp.); orchids like: Phragmipedium boisserianum, Masdevallia vargasii, etc.

== Conservation ==
The main threats to this protected area are: the illegal settlement of farmers inside the forest who clear the land for agriculture; the extraction of wild orchids and animals for sale; timber extraction and unsustainable fishing practices.

A forest-conservation and climate-mitigation initiative in the protected forest has used conservation agreements linked to voluntary-market REDD+ finance, and has been associated with Conservation International Peru.
