= Conservation International Peru =

Country programme of Conservation International in Peru

- Conservación Internacional Perú
- Abbreviation: CI Perú
- Formation: 1989
- Type: Country programme
- Headquarters: Lima, Peru
- Region served: Peru
- Parent organization: Conservation International
- Website: peru.conservation.org

Conservation International Peru (Conservación Internacional Perú) is the country programme of Conservation International in Peru. It began working in Peru in 1989.

Its work in Peru includes protected-area management, forest conservation, partnerships with Indigenous peoples and local communities, marine and coastal conservation, and conservation-finance initiatives. Major programme strands have included management support and conservation agreements in the Alto Mayo Protection Forest (Bosque de Protección Alto Mayo, BPAM), communal-reserve initiatives in the Peruvian Amazon, and the 2023 Tropical Forest and Coral Reef Conservation Act (TFCCA) debt-for-nature agreement.

== Overview ==
Headquartered in Lima, Conservation International Peru maintains offices in Pucallpa (Ucayali), Rioja (San Martín), and Iquitos (Loreto). Its work has centred on the Alto Mayo landscape in San Martín and, since 2020, has expanded to other Amazonian regions through Indigenous and communal-reserve initiatives and to the Pacific coast through marine and coastal conservation.

Its programme is organised around four themes: sustainable landscapes, Indigenous peoples, oceans, and sustainable businesses. These themes cover protected-area management and sustainable production landscapes, Indigenous governance and community conservation, marine and coastal management, and support for more sustainable business models.

== History ==
The programme began working in Peru in 1989. In its early years it focused on promoting protected areas in high-biodiversity regions, including support for master plans, management committees, and work in buffer zones. Its protected-area work over the following decade included Bahuaja Sonene National Park, established in 1996, and Tambopata National Reserve, established in 2000. Later milestones in that strand included Yaguas National Park, established in 2018.

From 2008, it worked in the Alto Mayo basin in San Martín on reducing deforestation, promoting sustainable agriculture, and linking local development with ecosystem protection.

From 2011, it developed a sustainable-landscape programme in Alto Mayo, centred on Moyobamba and Rioja. In 2012 it received the administration contract for the BPAM and began working there with the Servicio Nacional de Áreas Naturales Protegidas por el Estado (SERNANP) and partner organisations on protected-area management, governance, and deforestation reduction.

From 2020, the programme expanded beyond Alto Mayo to other Amazonian regions and to the Pacific coast. Its Amazon work included efforts to promote sustainable businesses and strengthen local economies, while its oceans programme focused on marine-coastal protected areas, artisanal fisheries, nature-based tourism, and mangroves and coastal wetlands.

In September 2023, Peru, the United States, and four non-governmental organisations finalised a TFCCA debt-for-nature agreement for forest conservation financing in the Peruvian Amazon.

Later in 2023, the Green Climate Fund (GCF) approved project preparation funding to develop a funding proposal intended to scale communal-reserve co-management with Indigenous organisations in the Peruvian Amazon, listing Conservation International as the accredited entity and Conservation International Peru as the proposed lead executing entity for proposal development.

== Programmes and operations ==
Selected programme locations mentioned in the article (1 Lima; 2 Pucallpa; 3 Rioja; 4 Iquitos; 5 Alto Mayo Protection Forest)

=== Alto Mayo landscape ===
In San Martín, the programme's work has centred on the Alto Mayo basin.

Since 2011, it has developed a sustainable-landscape programme in Alto Mayo, and since 2012 it has managed the BPAM under an administration contract with SERNANP. The programme has worked on protected-area governance, deforestation reduction, sustainable production, and broader landscape management in the basin.

In the BPAM and surrounding landscape, the programme has combined conservation agreements with protected-area management and sustainable livelihoods. Participating residents agreed to avoid new deforestation and contribute to protected-area management in exchange for technical support to improve production, add new crops, and access higher-value markets. The initiative has involved more than 960 participating families.

The wider Alto Mayo programme has also included work with Awajún communities, civil society, and local governments across the basin. Voluntary-market REDD+ finance has been used to support the conservation-agreement model in Alto Mayo.

=== Peruvian Amazon communal reserves ===
A more recent strand has concerned communal reserves in the Peruvian Amazon. In 2023, a GCF project-preparation grant identified Conservation International Peru as the proposed lead executing entity for development of a funding proposal to scale the communal-reserve co-management model with Indigenous organisations.

The approved preparatory work covered 10 communal-reserve landscapes and included baseline studies, vulnerability assessment, options analysis, natural-capital and ecosystem-services mapping, consultation processes, and environmental, social, gender, and grievance-planning measures. The grant supported proposal development rather than full programme implementation.

=== Ucayali and El Sira ===
In Ucayali, the programme has participated in conservation-agreement and livelihood work around the Reserva Comunal El Sira with SERNANP, ECOSIRA, and Indigenous communities.

In 2021, SERNANP and ECOSIRA promoted conservation agreements with neighbouring communities in Ucayali and Huánuco as part of efforts to strengthen co-management, generate local economic benefits, and support sustainable activities around the reserve.

One livelihood-linked example has been support for the women's association Wexa Beka of the Comunidad Nativa Atahualpa de Tabacoa, which produces crafts with Shipibo identity near the reserve.

=== Marine and coastal conservation ===
Since 2020, the programme has also worked on marine-coastal protected areas, threatened-species habitats, artisanal fisheries, nature-based tourism, and the management of mangroves and coastal wetlands.

In Sechura Bay, it has also participated in application of the Ocean Health Index as a marine-management diagnostic. A 2022 Peruvian government submission reported a Sechura Bay score of 76, with high scores for carbon storage, coastal protection, biodiversity, food provision, and local economy, but a low score for clean water.

=== Madre de Dios forestry work ===
In Madre de Dios, public and technical documents have linked the programme to the Rodal Semillero Tahuamanu conservation concession in Tahuamanu, where work has included monitoring and management of seed trees of mahogany (Swietenia macrophylla) and cedar (Cedrela odorata).

Selected programme landscapes and locations of Conservation International Peru
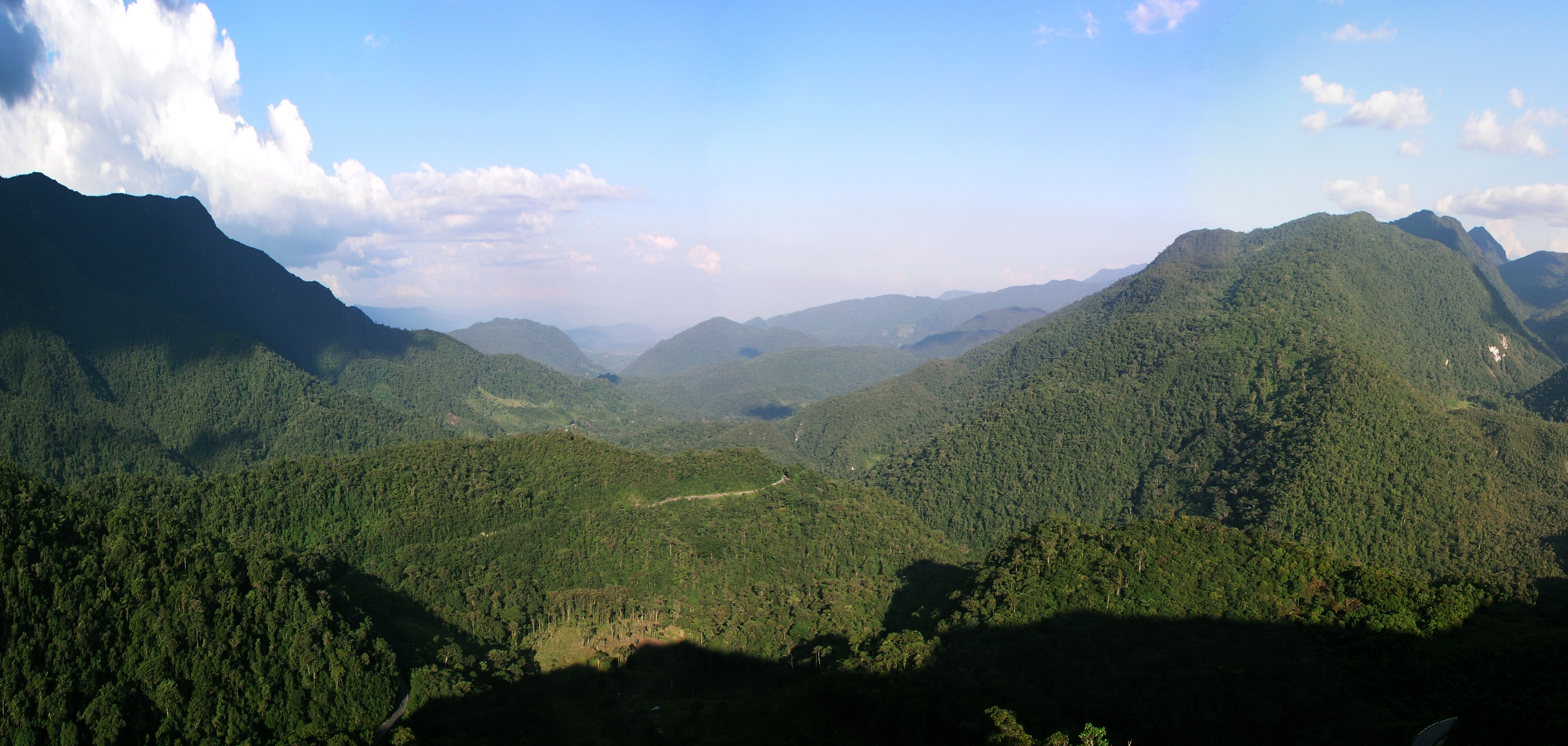
The Alto Mayo massif viewed from Abra Patricia in San Martín Region, near the Alto Mayo Protection Forest

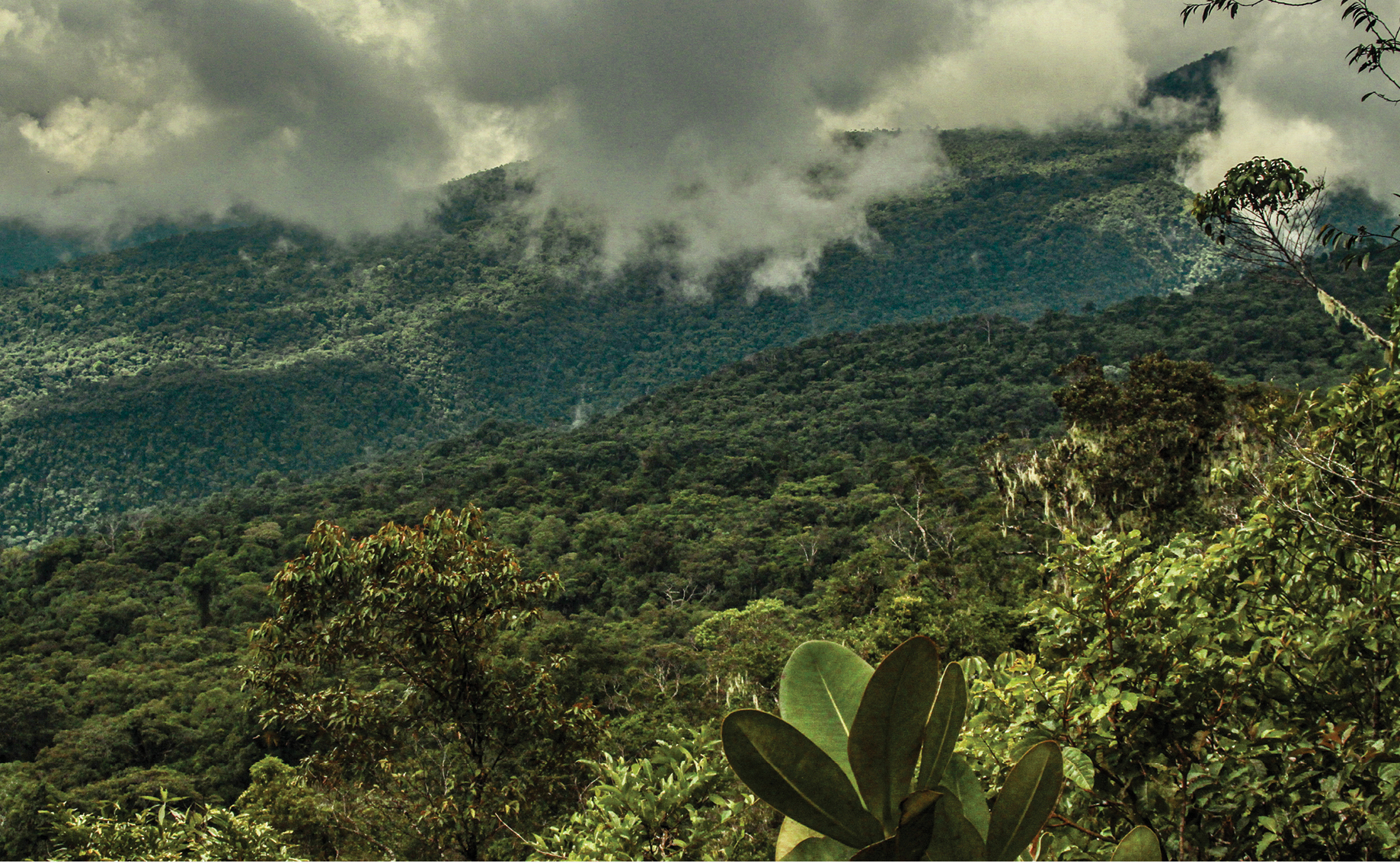
Montane forest in the El Sira Communal Reserve

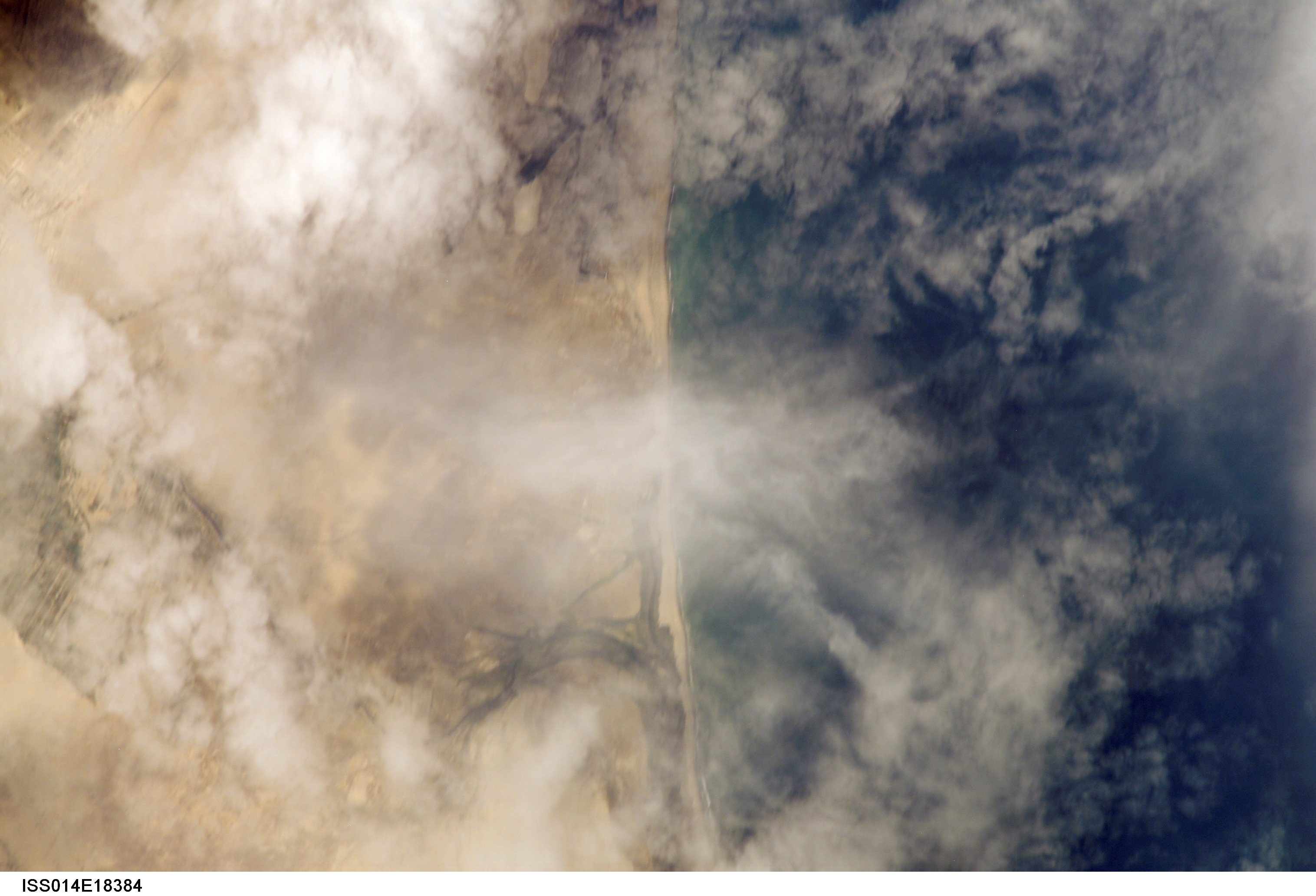
Sechura Bay seen from the International Space Station

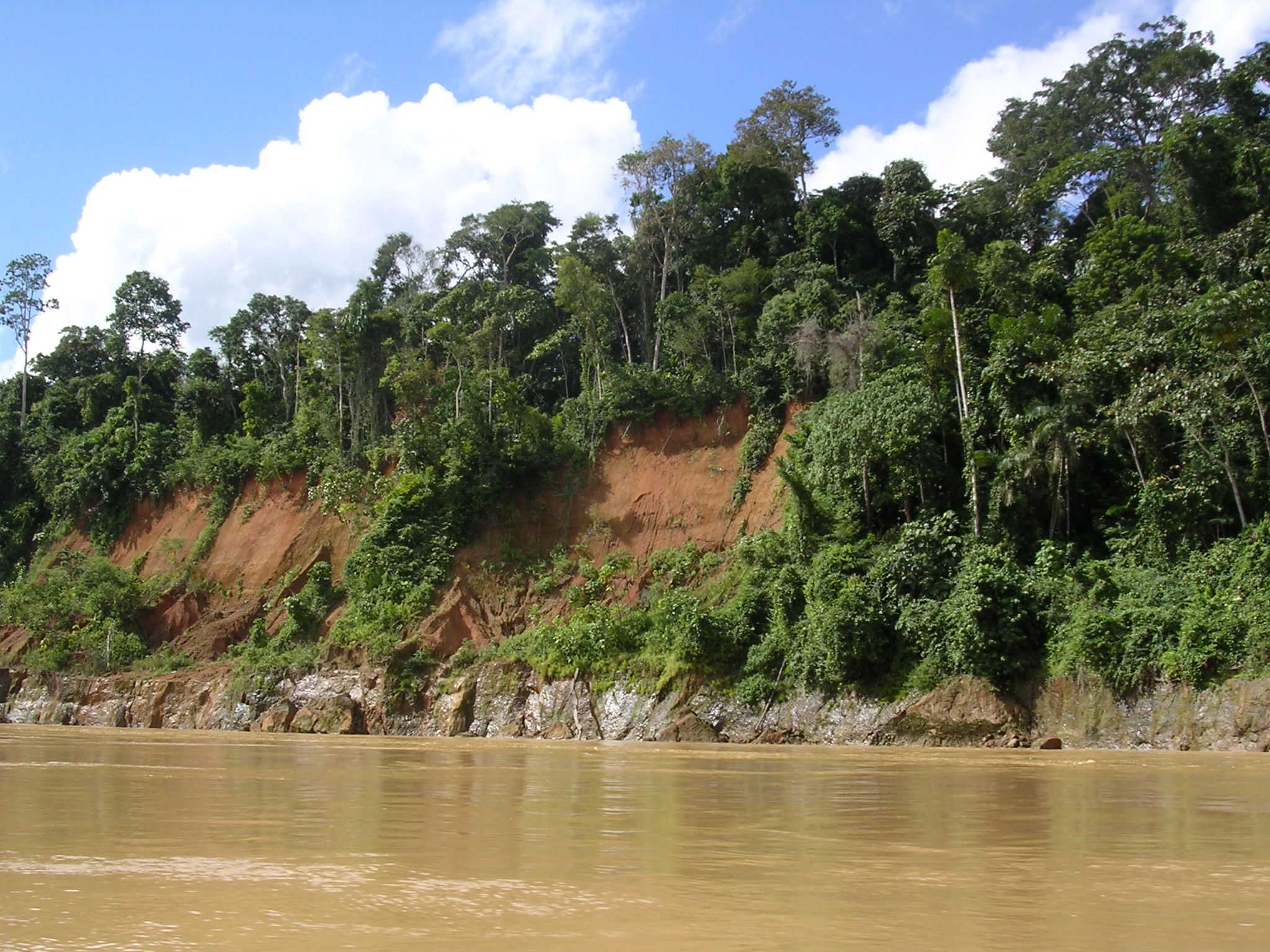
Upland tropical rainforest in Madre de Dios Region

== Partnerships ==
Recurring public and institutional partners have included SERNANP in protected-area administration and co-management, the Ministry of Environment in marine-coastal and climate-related coordination, Profonanpe in TFCCA-linked grant administration, and the Green Climate Fund in communal-reserve proposal preparation. Marine and coastal work has also involved collaboration with the Sociedad Peruana de Derecho Ambiental (SPDA) and Save The Waves in a Global Environment Facility (GEF)-linked surf-ecosystems initiative.

On the Indigenous, community, and business side, the programme has worked with Awajún communities in the Alto Mayo, with ANECAP and the Ejecutores de Contrato de Administración (ECAs) of communal reserves in Amazonian co-management initiatives, with ECOSIRA around Reserva Comunal El Sira, and with the Cámara de Comercio de Pueblos Indígenas del Perú (CCPIP) through the AEA platform. Examples of local producer and community partners featured in programme materials include the women's association Wexa Beka in Ucayali.

== Funding and conservation finance ==
A major conservation-finance mechanism linked to the programme has been the TFCCA debt-for-nature agreement finalised in 2023. Under the agreement, Peru's debt-service payments to the United States will be reduced by more than US$20 million over 13 years, through 2036, and redirected into a conservation fund that provides grants for tropical-forest protection and restoration, improved natural-resource management, and sustainable livelihoods in the Peruvian Amazon. Profonanpe was designated the initial grants administrator.

Profonanpe later implemented this mechanism through the Bosques Tropicales competitive fund, which provides non-reimbursable financing for projects that conserve tropical forests and support sustainable development. The first call, launched in 2025, received 111 applications from six regions of the southern Amazon. Its 2025-1 award round selected 19 initiatives and allocated S/10.7 million in grants. A second 2025-2 call later received 73 applications and offered two financing tracks: projects of up to S/200,000 for up to three years, and larger initiatives of up to S/1,250,000 for up to five years.

Funding linked to the Alto Mayo landscape has combined conservation agreements with voluntary-market REDD+ finance and carbon-credit generation. In Alto Mayo, carbon payments in the voluntary market have supported agreements under which residents of the protected area commit to no new deforestation and to participation in protected-area management in exchange for technical and productive support. Project documentation described the resulting generation and verification of carbon credits under voluntary carbon and community-biodiversity standards, linking private carbon finance to protected-area management carried out with SERNANP and partner organisations.

A separate sustainable-businesses mechanism has also been developed through the Alianza Empresarial por la Amazonía (AEA), directed to Amazonian micro, small, and medium-sized enterprises and producer organisations. Developed with the Federación Peruana de Cajas Municipales de Ahorro y Crédito, biocréditos were structured as green-credit products for ventures meeting Ministry of Environment criteria for bio-businesses, including ecotourism, non-livestock agroforestry, and non-timber forest products. By mid-2024, the product was being offered through six municipal savings banks—Piura, Ica, Maynas, Cusco, Huancayo, and Arequipa—for enterprises in Huánuco, Pasco, Amazonas, Loreto, Ucayali, San Martín, and Madre de Dios. Reporting on the rollout stated that 183 biocréditos totalling S/1,286,200 had been issued from November 2023 to April 2024.

== Impact and evaluation ==
A 2020 comparative review of conservation agreement programmes in the Amazon treated Alto Mayo as a site-based programme in a 182,000-hectare protected forest involving more than 960 participating families. It described the initiative as combining conservation, livelihoods, and restoration objectives, and noted that conservation agreements exchanged commitments to avoid new deforestation and support protected-area management for technical assistance to improve production, diversify crops, and access higher-value markets.

A 2021 peer-reviewed assessment of six ongoing Peruvian payment-for-ecosystem-services and REDD+ initiatives, including the Alto Mayo Conservation REDD+ Initiative, found only limited adoption of impact-oriented design features such as spatial targeting, payment differentiation, enforced conditionality, and locally tailored equity and transparency measures. It concluded that rigorous impact-evaluation evidence remained limited and that stronger design and monitoring would improve assessment of environmental and welfare outcomes. For Alto Mayo specifically, it noted that robust socioeconomic outcome estimates had not yet been reported and that some avoided-deforestation estimates in the public record were based on implementer-commissioned analysis.

== Reception ==
In 2023, the Alto Mayo carbon project received international media attention over disputes concerning land use and carbon accounting. Conservation International disputed aspects of the reporting and commissioned an independent review. In 2024, it published the review's findings, which stated that the 2021 dismantling of structures had been carried out by Peruvian security forces to recover state-owned property and recommended further strengthening safeguards and engagement around local land-use conflicts.
