= San Fernando District =

Coordinates: 5.9016°S 77.2755°W

San Fernando
- District
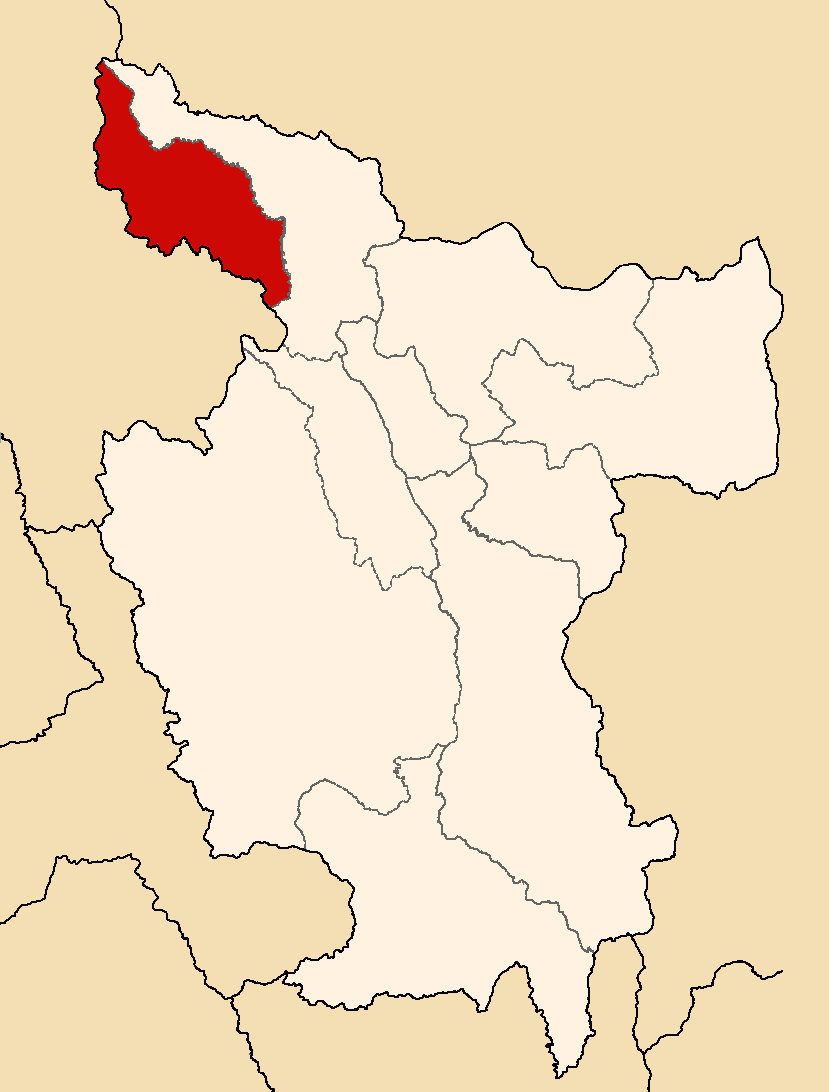
- Interactive map of San Fernando
- Country: Peru
- Region: San Martín
- Province: Rioja
- Founded: December 26, 1984
- Capital: San Fernando

Government
  - Mayor: Benedicto Rojas Ortiz

Area
  - Total: 63.53 km^{2} (24.53 sq mi)
- Elevation: 825 m (2,707 ft)

Population (2005 census)
  - Total: 4,127
  - Density: 64.96/km^{2} (168.2/sq mi)
- Time zone: UTC-5 (PET)
- UBIGEO: 220807

San Fernando District is one of nine districts of the province Rioja in Peru.
