= Habana District =

Coordinates: 6.0809°S 77.0973°W

- District
- Interactive map of Habana District
- Country: Peru
- Region: San Martín
- Province: Moyobamba
- Founded: January 2, 1857
- Capital: Habana

Government
  - Mayor: Wilmer Constantino Fernandez

Area
  - Total: 91.25 km^{2} (35.23 sq mi)
- Elevation: 855 m (2,805 ft)

Population (2017)
  - Total: 1,675
  - Density: 18.36/km^{2} (47.54/sq mi)
- Time zone: UTC-5 (PET)
- UBIGEO: 220103

Habana District is one of six districts of the province Moyobamba in Peru.
