= Posic District =

Coordinates: 6.0153°S 77.1671°W

- District
- Interactive map of Posic District
- Country: Peru
- Region: San Martín
- Province: Rioja
- Founded: December 9, 1935
- Capital: Posic

Government
  - Mayor: Pedro Arriaga Aguilar

Area
  - Total: 54.65 km^{2} (21.10 sq mi)
- Elevation: 820 m (2,690 ft)

Population (2005 census)
  - Total: 1,394
  - Density: 25.51/km^{2} (66.06/sq mi)
- Time zone: UTC-5 (PET)
- UBIGEO: 220806

Posic District is one of nine districts of the province Rioja in Peru. It is famous for the archaeological research conducted at the prehistoric site of Posic. The excavations at Posic has contributed with at least two major results. 1) The Incas' presence in the area can now be dated to 1470 AD. 2) One of the main Inca roads can be traced as far into the highlands and jungles as to Posic. Here the road is present and furthermore is a Tambu.
