= Yorongos District =

Coordinates: 5.8167°S 77.3522°W

Yorongos
- District
- Interactive map of Yorongos
- Country: Peru
- Region: San Martín
- Province: Rioja
- Founded: December 9, 1935
- Capital: Yorongos

Government
  - Mayor: Florentino Altamirano Vasquez

Area
  - Total: 74.53 km^{2} (28.78 sq mi)
- Elevation: 860 m (2,820 ft)

Population (2005 census)
  - Total: 3,145
  - Density: 42.20/km^{2} (109.3/sq mi)
- Time zone: UTC-5 (PET)
- UBIGEO: 220808

Yorongos District is one of nine districts of the province Rioja in Peru.
