= Tingo de Ponasa District =

Coordinates: 6.9406°S 76.2502°W

Tingo de Ponasa
- District
- Interactive map of Tingo de Ponasa
- Country: Peru
- Region: San Martín
- Province: Picota
- Founded: November 22, 1960
- Capital: Tingo de Ponasa

Government
  - Mayor: Teodomiro Ruiz Sanchez

Area
  - Total: 340.01 km^{2} (131.28 sq mi)
- Elevation: 240 m (790 ft)

Population (2005 census)
  - Total: 4,153
  - Density: 12.21/km^{2} (31.64/sq mi)
- Time zone: UTC-5 (PET)
- UBIGEO: 220709

Tingo de Ponasa District is one of ten districts of the province Picota in Peru.

== Climate ==
Climate data for Tingo de Ponasa, elevation 238 m (781 ft), (1991–2020)
| Month | Jan | Feb | Mar | Apr | May | Jun | Jul | Aug | Sep | Oct | Nov | Dec | Year |
|---|---|---|---|---|---|---|---|---|---|---|---|---|---|
| Mean daily maximum °C (°F) | 33.8 (92.8) | 32.7 (90.9) | 32.5 (90.5) | 31.7 (89.1) | 31.9 (89.4) | 31.7 (89.1) | 31.6 (88.9) | 32.8 (91.0) | 33.5 (92.3) | 33.8 (92.8) | 34.5 (94.1) | 33.6 (92.5) | 32.8 (91.1) |
| Mean daily minimum °C (°F) | 20.2 (68.4) | 20.1 (68.2) | 19.8 (67.6) | 19.7 (67.5) | 19.6 (67.3) | 18.9 (66.0) | 18.4 (65.1) | 18.5 (65.3) | 19.1 (66.4) | 19.9 (67.8) | 20.3 (68.5) | 20.5 (68.9) | 19.6 (67.2) |
| Average precipitation mm (inches) | 77.3 (3.04) | 92.4 (3.64) | 123.6 (4.87) | 139.8 (5.50) | 63.0 (2.48) | 56.8 (2.24) | 49.3 (1.94) | 50.7 (2.00) | 78.0 (3.07) | 89.1 (3.51) | 114.6 (4.51) | 65.3 (2.57) | 999.9 (39.37) |
Source: National Meteorology and Hydrology Service of Peru
