= Calzada District =

Coordinates: 6.0328°S 77.0764°W

- District
- Interactive map of Calzada District
- Country: Peru
- Region: San Martín
- Province: Moyobamba
- Founded: January 2, 1857
- Capital: Calzada

Government
  - Mayor: Llimy Diaz La Torre

Area
  - Total: 95.38 km^{2} (36.83 sq mi)
- Elevation: 860 m (2,820 ft)

Population (2017)
  - Total: 4,609
  - Density: 48.32/km^{2} (125.2/sq mi)
- Time zone: UTC-5 (PET)
- UBIGEO: 220102

Calzada District is one of six districts of the province Moyobamba in Peru. Calzada is a small town and has 3,586 inhabitants according to a 2017 census.
