= Shamboyacu District =

Coordinates: 7.0237°S 76.1352°W

Shamboyacu
- District
- Interactive map of Shamboyacu
- Country: Peru
- Region: San Martín
- Province: Picota
- Founded: January 29, 1965
- Capital: Shamboyacu

Government
  - Mayor: Ricardo Morales León

Area
  - Total: 415.58 km^{2} (160.46 sq mi)
- Elevation: 240 m (790 ft)

Population (2005 census)
  - Total: 5,637
  - Density: 13.56/km^{2} (35.13/sq mi)
- Time zone: UTC-5 (PET)
- UBIGEO: 220708

Shamboyacu District is one of ten districts of the province Picota in Peru.
