= Regional Government of San Martín =

Regional government in Peru

- Gobierno Regional de San Martín
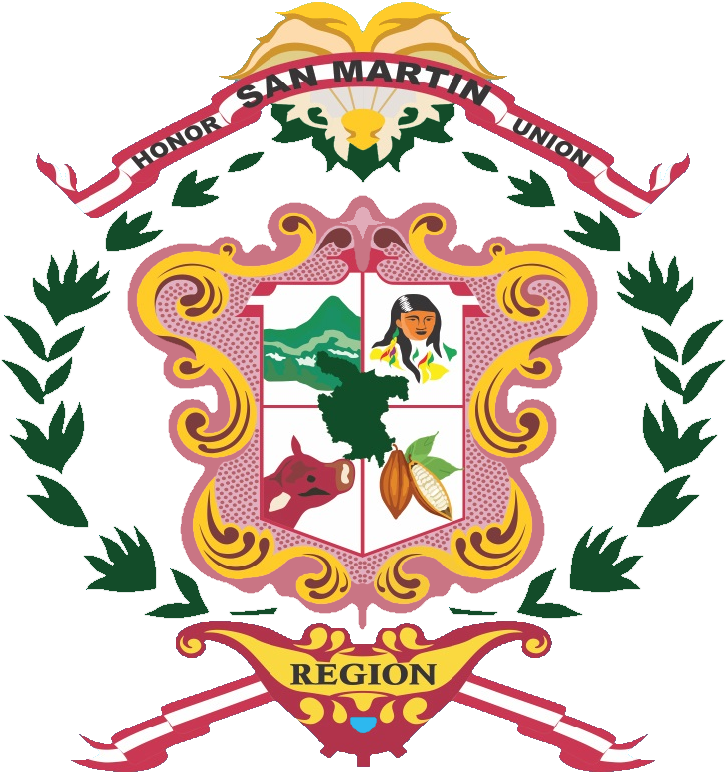

Regional Government overview
- Formed: January 1, 2003; 22 years ago
- Jurisdiction: Department of San Martín
- Website: Government site

The Regional Government of San Martín (Spanish: Gobierno Regional de San Martín; GORE San Martín) is the regional government that represents the Department of San Martín. It is the body with legal identity in public law and its own assets, which is in charge of the administration of provinces of the department in Peru. Its purpose is the social, cultural and economic development of its constituency. It is based in the city of Moyobamba.

== List of representatives ==
Governor	Political party	Period
Max Ramírez García	APRA	January 1, 2003–March 8, 2005
Julio Cárdenas Sánchez	APRA	March 8, 2005–December 31, 2006
César Villanueva	Nueva Amazonía	January 1, 2007–December 31, 2010
César Villanueva	Nueva Amazonía	January 1, 2011–January 23, 2014
Javier Ocampo Ruiz	Nueva Amazonía	January 24, 2014–December 31, 2014
Víctor Noriega Reátegui	Fuerza Popular	January 1, 2015–December 31, 2018
Pedro Bogarín	Acción Regional	January 1, 2019–December 31, 2022
Walter Grundel	Somos Perú	January 1, 2023–Incumbent

== See also ==
- Regional Governments of Peru
- Department of San Martín
