= San Cristóbal District, Picota =

Coordinates: 6.6665°S 76.5929°W

San Cristóbal District
- District
- Interactive map of San Cristóbal District
- Country: Peru
- Region: San Martín
- Province: Picota
- Founded: 31 January 1944
- Capital: Puerto Rico

Government
  - Mayor: Keith Jhonny Garcia Puyo (2019–2022)

Area
  - Total: 29.63 km^{2} (11.44 sq mi)
- Elevation: 220 m (720 ft)

Population (2017)
  - Total: 1,192
  - Density: 40.23/km^{2} (104.2/sq mi)
- Time zone: UTC-5 (PET)
- UBIGEO: 220706

San Cristóbal District is one of ten districts of the province Picota in Peru.
