= San Hilarion District =

Coordinates: 6.9993°S 76.4420°W

San Hilarion
- District
- Location of San Hilarion in the Picota Province
- Country: Peru
- Region: San Martín
- Province: Picota
- Founded: August 28, 1859
- Capital: San Cristóbal de Sisa

Government
  - Mayor: David Michael Melgar Manrique

Area
  - Total: 96.55 km^{2} (37.28 sq mi)
- Elevation: 195 m (640 ft)

Population (2005 census)
  - Total: 4,242
  - Density: 43.94/km^{2} (113.8/sq mi)
- Time zone: UTC-5 (PET)
- UBIGEO: 220707

San Hilarion District is one of ten districts of the province Picota in Peru.
