= Yantalo District =

Coordinates: 5.9740°S 77.0206°W

- District
- Interactive map of Yantalo District
- Country: Peru
- Region: San Martín
- Province: Moyobamba
- Founded: December 30, 1944
- Capital: Yantalo

Government
  - Mayor: Victor Monteza Davila

Area
  - Total: 100.32 km^{2} (38.73 sq mi)
- Elevation: 830 m (2,720 ft)

Population (2017)
  - Total: 2,865
  - Density: 28.56/km^{2} (73.97/sq mi)
- Time zone: UTC-5 (PET)
- UBIGEO: 220106
- Website: www.yantalo.org

Yantalo District is one of six districts of the province Moyobamba in Peru.

Yantalo is a "quechua" word meaning "wood carrier". As of May 2009 the "Yantalinos" walk every day to the forest to collect dry wood. They cut each piece of almost equal size, bundle them up and carry the wood on their backs, usually tied with a cloth around their forehead. Main use is for fire / cooking.
