= Rioja, Peru =

Rioja
- Town
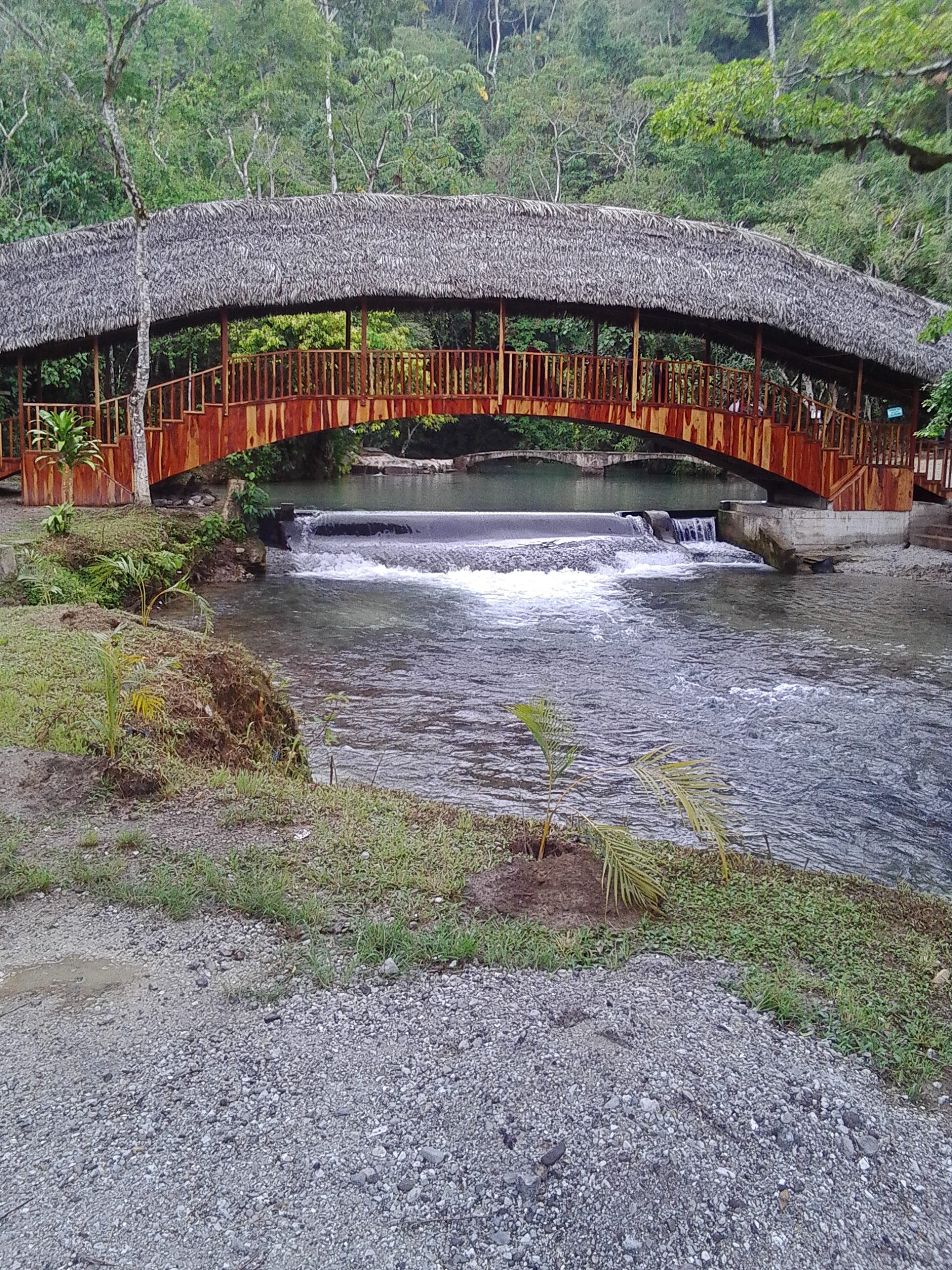

- Location within Peru
- Coordinates: 6°03′00″S 77°08′30″W
- Country: Peru
- Region: San Martín
- Province: Rioja
- District: Rioja District
- Elevation: 848 m (2,782 ft)

Population
  - Estimate (2015): 22,197
- Demonym: Riojano/a
- Website: www.rioja.com.pe

Rioja is the capital of Rioja Province in the San Martín Region in northern Peru. It is situated to the west of Moyobamba. There are 24,263 inhabitants according to the 2007 census.

The town is 848 metres above sea level and has a semi-humid subtropical climate.

== History ==
During the period of the Incas, the Rioja Province was inhabited by two tribes, the Uquihuas and the Chepenes.

At the end of the 16th century, one of the first Catholic missionaries arrived at Uquihua.

Rioja was founded in September, 1782 and was originally named Santo Toribio de la Nueva Rioja.

== Geography ==
Rioja is situated in the valley of the upper Mayo River in the north of the San Martín Region. Its coordinates are longitude 77°08’30” and latitude 06º03’00”.

The peaks surrounding Rioja exceeds 1,000 metres above sea level.

The average temperature is 22.5 °C. with actual temperatures varying between 16.5 °C and 28.4 °C.

=== Climate ===
Climate data for Rioja, elevation 823 m (2,700 ft), (1991–2020)
Month	Jan	Feb	Mar	Apr	May	Jun	Jul	Aug	Sep	Oct	Nov	Dec	Year
Mean daily maximum °C (°F)	28.2 (82.8)	28.0 (82.4)	28.2 (82.8)	28.5 (83.3)	28.7 (83.7)	28.5 (83.3)	28.6 (83.5)	29.2 (84.6)	29.5 (85.1)	29.4 (84.9)	29.2 (84.6)	28.6 (83.5)	28.7 (83.7)
Mean daily minimum °C (°F)	18.8 (65.8)	18.9 (66.0)	18.9 (66.0)	18.9 (66.0)	18.6 (65.5)	17.7 (63.9)	16.9 (62.4)	16.9 (62.4)	17.5 (63.5)	18.6 (65.5)	19.0 (66.2)	19.1 (66.4)	18.3 (65.0)
Average precipitation mm (inches)	128.5 (5.06)	169.6 (6.68)	188.6 (7.43)	150.5 (5.93)	118.5 (4.67)	56.3 (2.22)	56.6 (2.23)	70.3 (2.77)	91.5 (3.60)	150.2 (5.91)	141.8 (5.58)	143.1 (5.63)	1,465.5 (57.71)
Source: National Meteorology and Hydrology Service of Peru

== Communications and Transport ==
Rioja is connected to the rest of the country by land, air, and water.

=== Land ===
Connections via the "Carretera Marginal" (the main jungle highway). There are daily bus services as well as minibuses, collective taxis and lorries.

=== Air ===
The Rioja Airport accommodates small and medium sized airplanes, both for passengers and cargo.

=== River ===
Motor boats, canoes and rafts use the Mayo, Tonchima and Negro rivers for small cargo.
