= Tres Unidos District =

Coordinates: 6.8028°S 76.2231°W

- District
- Interactive map of Tres Unidos District
- Country: Peru
- Region: San Martín
- Province: Picota
- Founded: February 19, 1965
- Capital: Tres Unidos

Government
  - Mayor: Griserio Tocto Cieza

Area
  - Total: 246.52 km^{2} (95.18 sq mi)
- Elevation: 240 m (790 ft)

Population (2017)
  - Total: 3,889
  - Density: 15.78/km^{2} (40.86/sq mi)
- Time zone: UTC-5 (PET)
- UBIGEO: 220710

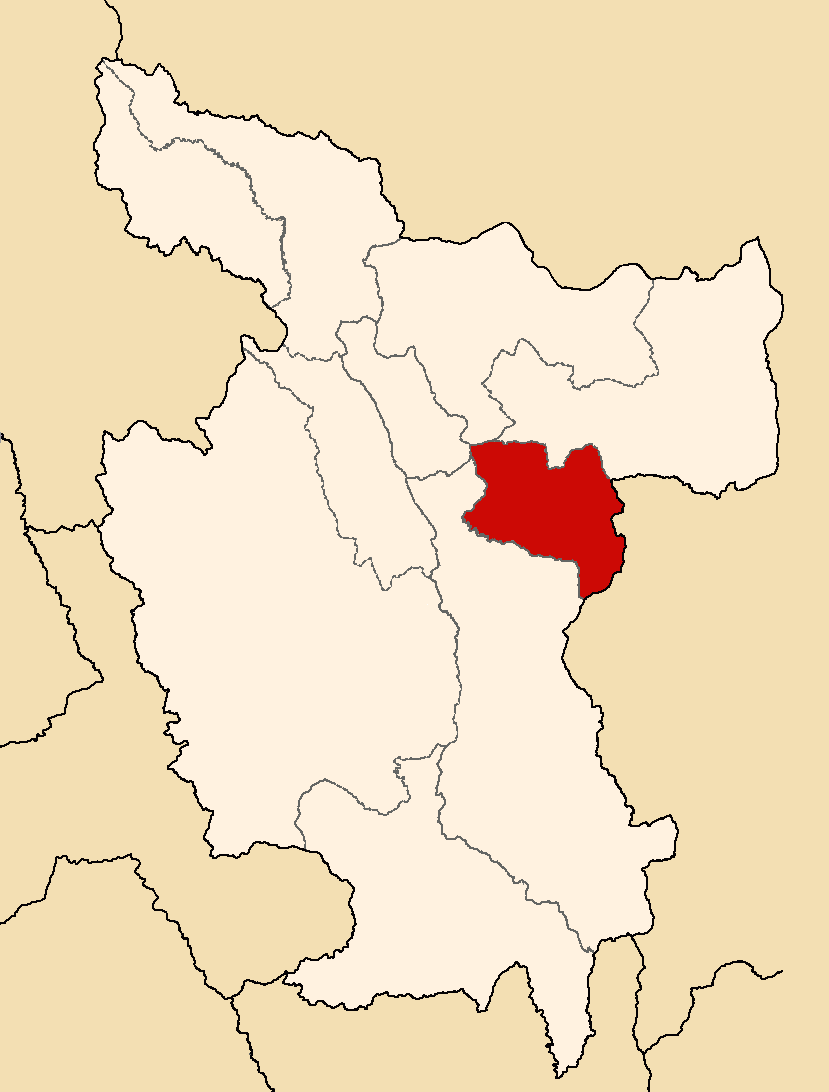
Picota, located in the San Martín region of Peru

Tres Unidos District is one of ten districts of the province Picota in Peru.
