= Pucacaca District =

Coordinates: 6.8518°S 76.3443°W

Pucacaca Puka Qaqa
- District
- Interactive map of Pucacaca
- Country: Peru
- Region: San Martín
- Province: Picota
- Founded: May 8, 1936
- Capital: Pucacaca

Government
  - Mayor: Eddy Galvez Garcia (2019-2022)

Area
  - Total: 230.72 km^{2} (89.08 sq mi)
- Elevation: 217 m (712 ft)

Population (2017)
  - Total: 2,971
  - Density: 12.88/km^{2} (33.35/sq mi)
- Time zone: UTC-5 (PET)
- UBIGEO: 220705

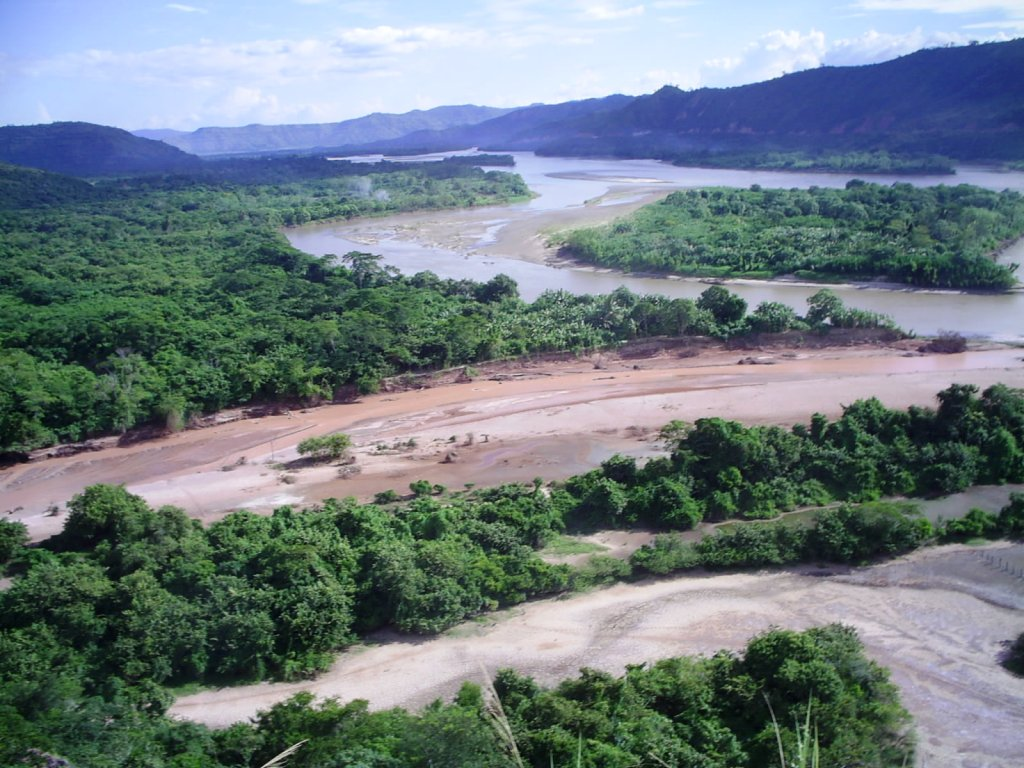
Misquiyacu ravine flowing into the Huallaga River, peripheral area of the Pilluana District.

Pucacaca (in Hispanicized spelling) or Puka Qaqa (Quechua puka red, qaqa rock, "red rock") is one of ten districts of the province Picota in Peru.
