= Soritor District =

Coordinates: 6.1373°S 77.1166°W

- District
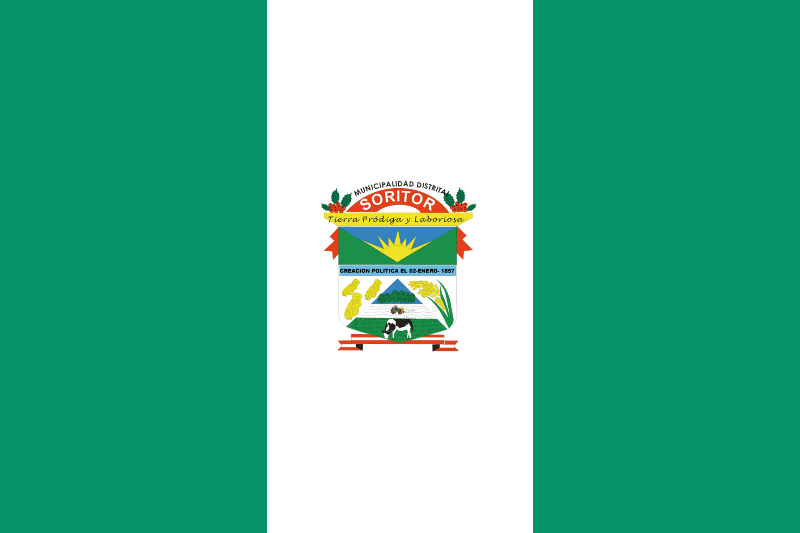
- Flag of the district of Soritor (Moyobamba, Peru)
- Interactive map of Soritor District
- Country: Peru
- Region: San Martín
- Province: Moyobamba
- Founded: January 2, 1857
- Capital: Soritor

Government
  - Mayor: Segundo Wilson Ortiz Chávez

Area
  - Total: 387.76 km^{2} (149.71 sq mi)
- Elevation: 875 m (2,871 ft)

Population (2017)
  - Total: 21,514
  - Density: 55.483/km^{2} (143.70/sq mi)
- Time zone: UTC-5 (PET)
- UBIGEO: 220105

Soritor District is one of six districts of the province Moyobamba in Peru.

== Climate ==
Climate data for Soritor, elevation 852 m (2,795 ft), (1991–2020)
Month	Jan	Feb	Mar	Apr	May	Jun	Jul	Aug	Sep	Oct	Nov	Dec	Year
Mean daily maximum °C (°F)	27.6 (81.7)	27.5 (81.5)	27.7 (81.9)	28.1 (82.6)	28.1 (82.6)	27.8 (82.0)	27.8 (82.0)	28.7 (83.7)	28.5 (83.3)	28.8 (83.8)	28.9 (84.0)	27.9 (82.2)	28.1 (82.6)
Mean daily minimum °C (°F)	18.7 (65.7)	18.8 (65.8)	18.7 (65.7)	18.5 (65.3)	18.5 (65.3)	17.6 (63.7)	17.1 (62.8)	17.0 (62.6)	17.1 (62.8)	18.3 (64.9)	18.9 (66.0)	18.7 (65.7)	18.2 (64.7)
Average precipitation mm (inches)	143.8 (5.66)	175.7 (6.92)	209.6 (8.25)	158.8 (6.25)	127.3 (5.01)	72.9 (2.87)	78.2 (3.08)	80.9 (3.19)	110.2 (4.34)	165.3 (6.51)	168.9 (6.65)	168.9 (6.65)	1,660.5 (65.38)
Source: National Meteorology and Hydrology Service of Peru
