= Pilluana District =

Coordinates: 6.7758°S 76.2941°W

- District
- Interactive map of Pilluana District
- Country: Peru
- Region: San Martín
- Province: Picota
- Founded: January 31, 1944
- Capital: Pilluana

Government
  - Mayor: Ulpiano Vela Muñoz

Area
  - Total: 239.27 km^{2} (92.38 sq mi)
- Elevation: 200 m (660 ft)

Population (2017)
  - Total: 865
  - Density: 3.62/km^{2} (9.36/sq mi)
- Time zone: UTC-5 (PET)
- UBIGEO: 220704

Pilluana District is one of ten districts of the province Picota in Peru.
