= Jepelacio District =

Coordinates: 6.1090°S 76.9239°W

Jepelacio
- District
- Interactive map of Jepelacio
- Country: Peru
- Region: San Martín
- Province: Moyobamba
- Founded: October 26, 1921
- Capital: Jepelacio

Government
  - Mayor: Tito Arquimides Solano Rodas

Area
  - Total: 360.03 km^{2} (139.01 sq mi)
- Elevation: 1,040 m (3,410 ft)

Population (2017)
  - Total: 15,377
  - Density: 42.710/km^{2} (110.62/sq mi)
- Time zone: UTC-5 (PET)
- UBIGEO: 220104

Jepelacio District is one of six districts of the province Moyobamba in Peru.

== Climate ==
Climate data for Jepelacio, elevation 1,057 m (3,468 ft), (1991–2020)
Month	Jan	Feb	Mar	Apr	May	Jun	Jul	Aug	Sep	Oct	Nov	Dec	Year
Mean daily maximum °C (°F)	27.4 (81.3)	27.2 (81.0)	27.5 (81.5)	27.7 (81.9)	27.2 (81.0)	27.1 (80.8)	27.3 (81.1)	28.3 (82.9)	28.6 (83.5)	28.6 (83.5)	29.0 (84.2)	27.7 (81.9)	27.8 (82.1)
Mean daily minimum °C (°F)	17.7 (63.9)	17.8 (64.0)	17.9 (64.2)	17.4 (63.3)	17.4 (63.3)	16.4 (61.5)	15.9 (60.6)	15.7 (60.3)	15.9 (60.6)	17.3 (63.1)	18.1 (64.6)	18.1 (64.6)	17.1 (62.8)
Average precipitation mm (inches)	115.6 (4.55)	142.0 (5.59)	177.9 (7.00)	112.9 (4.44)	90.5 (3.56)	58.6 (2.31)	50.3 (1.98)	62.9 (2.48)	104.0 (4.09)	133.6 (5.26)	122.3 (4.81)	129.8 (5.11)	1,300.4 (51.18)
Source: National Meteorology and Hydrology Service of Peru
