= Buenos Aires District =

Buenos Aires District may refer to:

- Buenos Aires District, Picota, Peru
- Buenos Aires District, Morropón, Peru
- Buenos Aires District, Buenos Aires, Costa Rica
