= Picota District =

Coordinates: 6.9136°S 76.3339°W

Picota
- District
- Interactive map of Picota
- Country: Peru
- Region: San Martín
- Province: Picota
- Founded: August 14, 1920
- Capital: Picota

Government
  - Mayor: Juan Dedicación Tocto Pilco

Area
  - Total: 218.72 km^{2} (84.45 sq mi)
- Elevation: 223 m (732 ft)

Population (2017)
  - Total: 10,203
  - Density: 46.649/km^{2} (120.82/sq mi)
- Time zone: UTC-5 (PET)
- UBIGEO: 220701

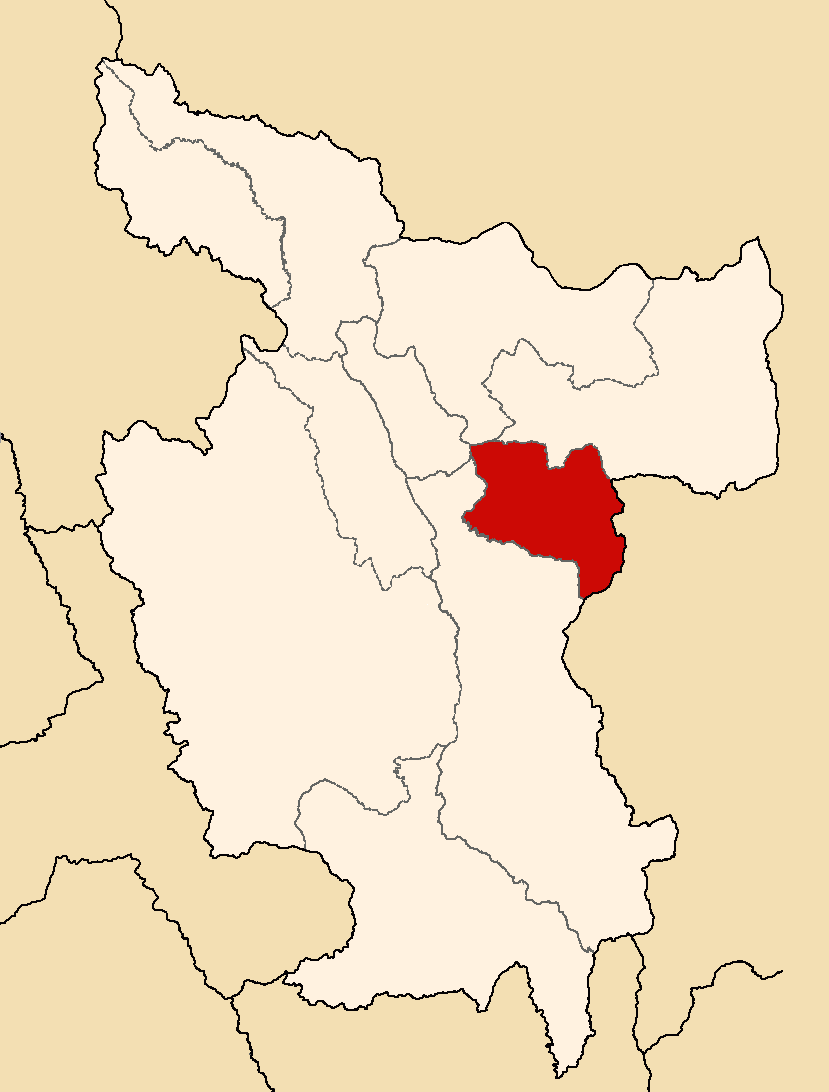
Location of the Picota province in the San Martín region of Peru.

Picota District is one of ten districts of the province Picota in Peru.
