= Yuracyacu District =

Coordinates: 5.9308°S 77.2334°W

Yuracyacu Yuraq Yaku
- District
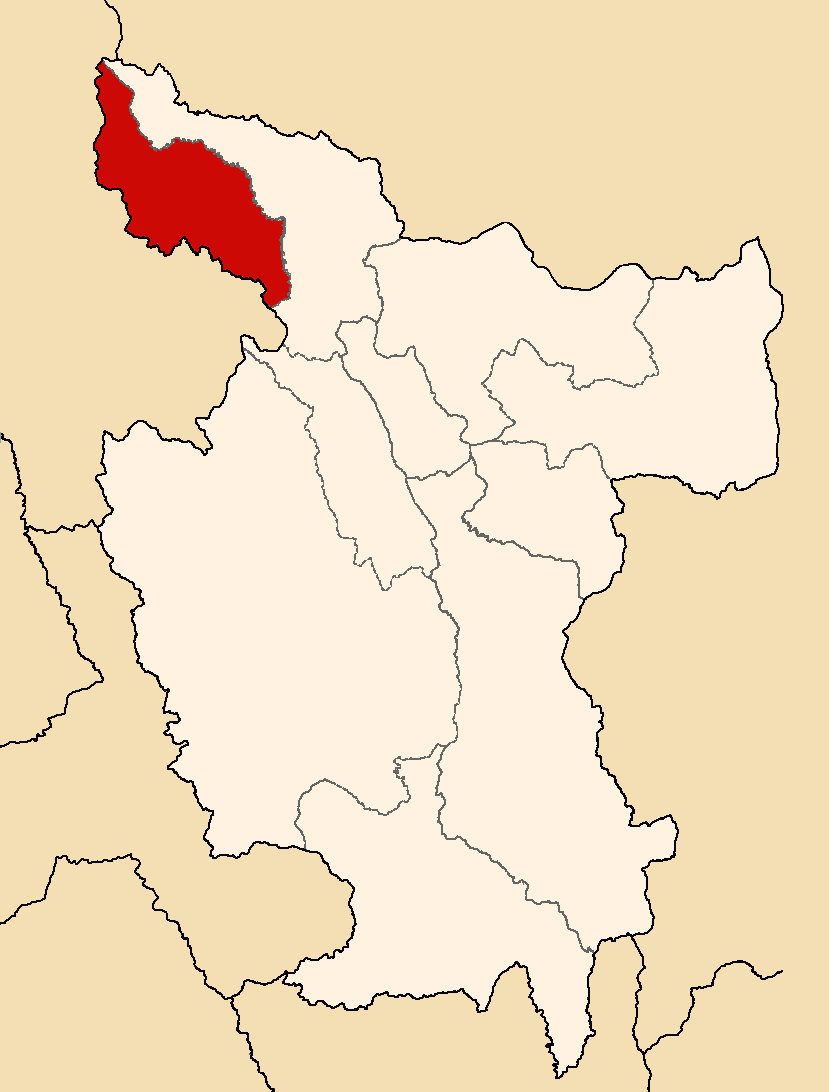
- Interactive map of Yuracyacu
- Country: Peru
- Region: San Martín
- Province: Rioja
- Founded: December 9, 1935
- Capital: Yuracyacu

Government
  - Mayor: Juan Mesia Tello

Area
  - Total: 13.74 km^{2} (5.31 sq mi)
- Elevation: 824 m (2,703 ft)

Population (2005 census)
  - Total: 4,702
  - Density: 342.2/km^{2} (886.3/sq mi)
- Time zone: UTC-5 (PET)
- UBIGEO: 220809

Yuracyacu (in hispanicized spelling, Yuraq Yaku in Quechua, yuraq white, yaku water, "white water") is one of nine districts of the province Rioja in Peru.
