= Caspisapa District =

Coordinates: 6.9576°S 76.4222°W

Caspisapa
- District
- Interactive map of Caspisapa
- Country: Peru
- Region: San Martín
- Province: Picota
- Founded: January 31, 1944
- Capital: Caspisapa

Government
  - Mayor: Rocio Del Pilar Garcia Fasanando

Area
  - Total: 81.44 km^{2} (31.44 sq mi)
- Elevation: 230 m (750 ft)

Population (2017)
  - Total: 2,126
  - Density: 26.11/km^{2} (67.61/sq mi)
- Time zone: UTC-5 (PET)
- UBIGEO: 220703

Caspisapa District is one of ten districts of the province Picota in Peru.
