= Picota province =

Coordinates: 6.917273°S 76.333477°W

Picota
- Province
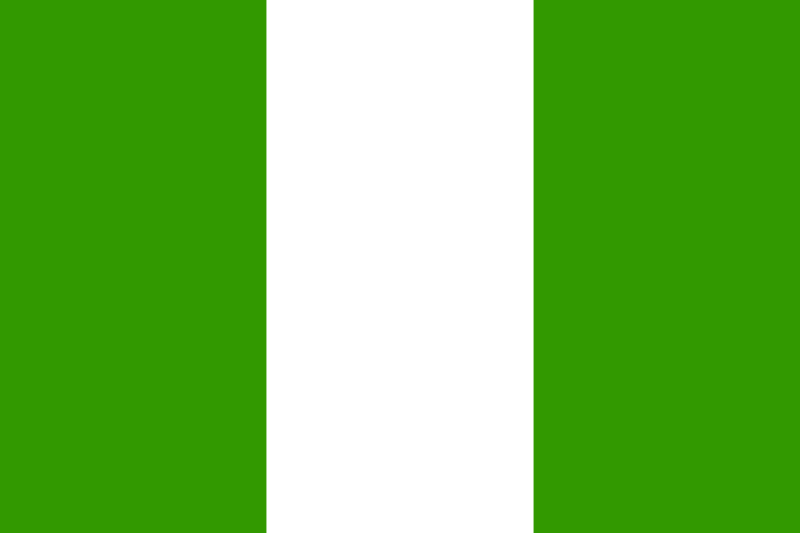
- Flag Coat of arms

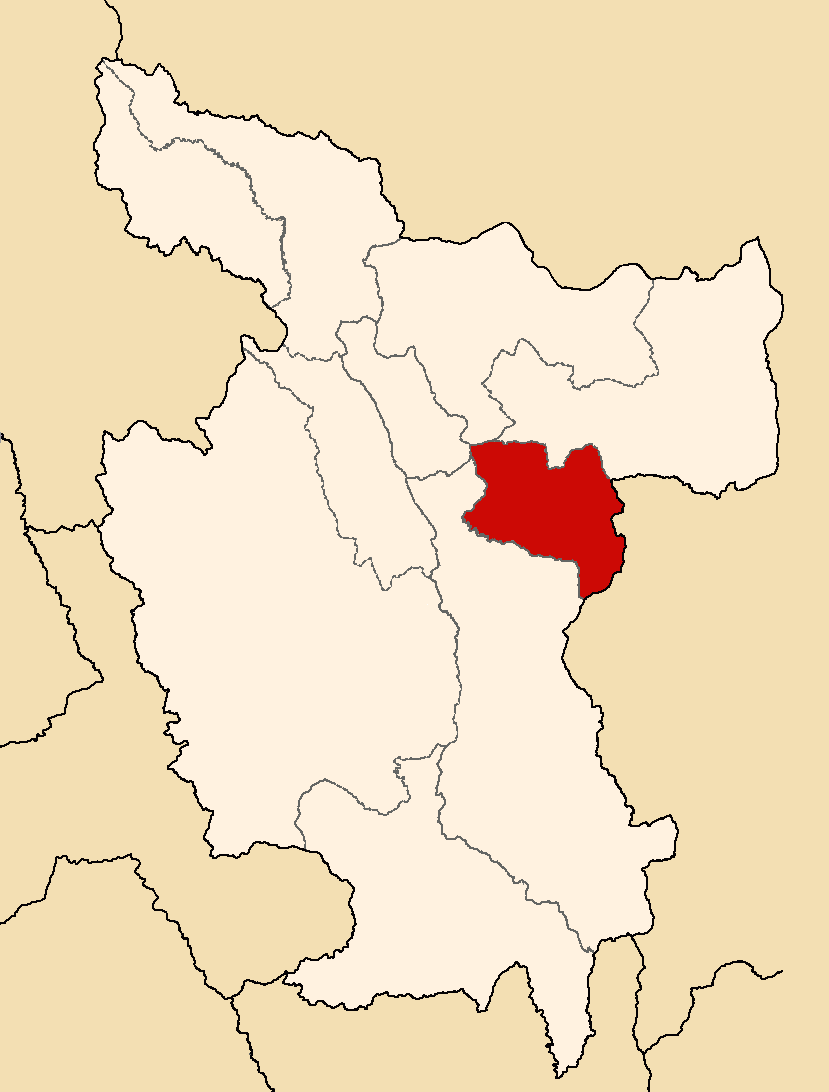
- Location of Picota in the San Martín Region
- Country: Peru
- Region: San Martín
- Capital: Picota

Government
  - Mayor: Juan Dedicación Tocto Pilco

Area
  - Total: 2,171.41 km^{2} (838.39 sq mi)

Population
  - Total: 40,545
  - Density: 18.672/km^{2} (48.361/sq mi)
- UBIGEO: 2207

Picota is one of ten provinces of the San Martín Region in northern Peru.

== Political division ==
The province is divided into ten districts.

- Buenos Aires (Buenos Aires)
- Caspisapa (Caspisapa)
- Picota (Picota)
- Pilluana (Pilluana)
- Pucacaca (Pucacaca)
- San Cristóbal (Puerto Rico)
- San Hilarion (San Cristóbal de Sisa)
- Shamboyacu (Shamboyacu)
- Tingo de Ponasa (Tingo de Ponasa)
- Tres Unidos (Tres Unidos)
