= Pardo Miguel District =

Coordinates: 5.7422°S 77.5108°W

Pardo Miguel
- District
- Interactive map of Pardo Miguel
- Country: Peru
- Region: San Martín
- Province: Rioja
- Founded: December 26, 1984
- Capital: Naranjos

Government
  - Mayor: Moises Diaz Diaz

Area
  - Total: 1,131.87 km^{2} (437.02 sq mi)
- Elevation: 975 m (3,199 ft)

Population (2005 census)
  - Total: 16,440
  - Density: 14.52/km^{2} (37.62/sq mi)
- Time zone: UTC-5 (PET)
- UBIGEO: 220805

Pardo Miguel District is one of nine districts of the province Rioja in Peru.
