= Awajun District =

Awajun
- District
- Interactive map of Awajun
- Coordinates: 5.8157°S 77.3877°W
- Country: Peru
- Region: San Martín
- Province: Rioja
- Founded: December 26, 1984
- Capital: Bajo Naranjillo

Government
  - Mayor: Jesús Ruiz Muñoz

Area
  - Total: 481.08 km^{2} (185.75 sq mi)
- Elevation: 875 m (2,871 ft)

Population (2005 census)
  - Total: 5,571
  - Density: 11.58/km^{2} (29.99/sq mi)
- Time zone: UTC-5 (PET)
- UBIGEO: 220802

Awajun District is one of nine districts of the province Rioja in Peru.

== Climate ==
Climate data for Naranjillo, Awajun, elevation 880 m (2,890 ft), (1991–2020)
Month	Jan	Feb	Mar	Apr	May	Jun	Jul	Aug	Sep	Oct	Nov	Dec	Year
Mean daily maximum °C (°F)	28.2 (82.8)	28.0 (82.4)	28.3 (82.9)	28.7 (83.7)	28.7 (83.7)	28.6 (83.5)	28.5 (83.3)	29.3 (84.7)	29.5 (85.1)	29.6 (85.3)	29.5 (85.1)	28.7 (83.7)	28.8 (83.9)
Mean daily minimum °C (°F)	18.8 (65.8)	18.8 (65.8)	18.8 (65.8)	19.0 (66.2)	18.7 (65.7)	18.1 (64.6)	17.4 (63.3)	17.4 (63.3)	17.7 (63.9)	18.6 (65.5)	18.9 (66.0)	19.0 (66.2)	18.4 (65.2)
Average precipitation mm (inches)	142.7 (5.62)	175.8 (6.92)	176.0 (6.93)	158.6 (6.24)	106.3 (4.19)	77.6 (3.06)	63.8 (2.51)	67.6 (2.66)	89.6 (3.53)	154.3 (6.07)	150.9 (5.94)	136.8 (5.39)	1,500 (59.06)
Source: National Meteorology and Hydrology Service of Peru
