= Moyobamba District =

Coordinates: 6.0357°S 77.0032°W

- District
- Interactive map of Moyobamba District
- Country: Peru
- Region: San Martín
- Province: Moyobamba
- Founded: January 2, 1857
- Capital: Moyobamba

Government
  - Mayor: Gastelo Huamán Chinchay

Area
  - Total: 2,737.57 km^{2} (1,056.98 sq mi)
- Elevation: 860 m (2,820 ft)

Population (2017)
  - Total: 76,325
  - Density: 27.881/km^{2} (72.210/sq mi)
- Time zone: UTC-5 (PET)
- UBIGEO: 220101

Moyobamba District is one of six districts of the province Moyobamba in Peru.

== Climate ==
Climate data for Moyobamba, elevation 879 m (2,884 ft), (1991–2020)
Month	Jan	Feb	Mar	Apr	May	Jun	Jul	Aug	Sep	Oct	Nov	Dec	Year
Mean daily maximum °C (°F)	27.9 (82.2)	27.7 (81.9)	28.0 (82.4)	28.4 (83.1)	28.6 (83.5)	28.3 (82.9)	28.5 (83.3)	29.2 (84.6)	29.4 (84.9)	29.2 (84.6)	29.2 (84.6)	28.1 (82.6)	28.5 (83.4)
Mean daily minimum °C (°F)	19.1 (66.4)	19.2 (66.6)	19.2 (66.6)	19.2 (66.6)	18.9 (66.0)	18.1 (64.6)	17.4 (63.3)	17.4 (63.3)	18.0 (64.4)	18.9 (66.0)	19.4 (66.9)	19.4 (66.9)	18.7 (65.6)
Average precipitation mm (inches)	131.0 (5.16)	170.1 (6.70)	178.0 (7.01)	126.0 (4.96)	97.8 (3.85)	59.6 (2.35)	53.6 (2.11)	66.4 (2.61)	90.0 (3.54)	126.9 (5.00)	126.1 (4.96)	146.0 (5.75)	1,371.5 (54)
Source: National Meteorology and Hydrology Service of Peru
