= Buenos Aires District, Picota =

Coordinates: 6.7891°S 76.3332°W

Buenos Aires District
- District
- Interactive map of Buenos Aires District
- Country: Peru
- Region: San Martín
- Province: Picota
- Founded: April 7, 1954
- Capital: Buenos Aires

Government
  - Mayor: Henry Rengifo Chistama

Area
  - Total: 272.97 km^{2} (105.39 sq mi)
- Elevation: 215 m (705 ft)

Population (2017)
  - Total: 2,924
  - Density: 10.71/km^{2} (27.74/sq mi)
- Time zone: UTC-5 (PET)
- UBIGEO: 220702

Buenos Aires District is one of ten districts of the province Picota in Peru.
