= Picota =

- Town
- Location within Peru
- Coordinates: 6°55′14.54″S 76°19′49.23″W
- Country: Peru
- Region: San Martín
- Province: Picota
- District: Picota

Government
  - Mayor: Juan Dedicación Tocto Pilco

Population (2007)
  - Total: 7,941
- Time zone: UTC-5 (PET)

Picota is a town in Northern Peru, capital of the province Picota in the region San Martín. There were 7,941 inhabitants, according to the 2007 census.
