= Rioja province, Peru =

Coordinates: 6.061366°S 77.166782°W

Rioja
- Province
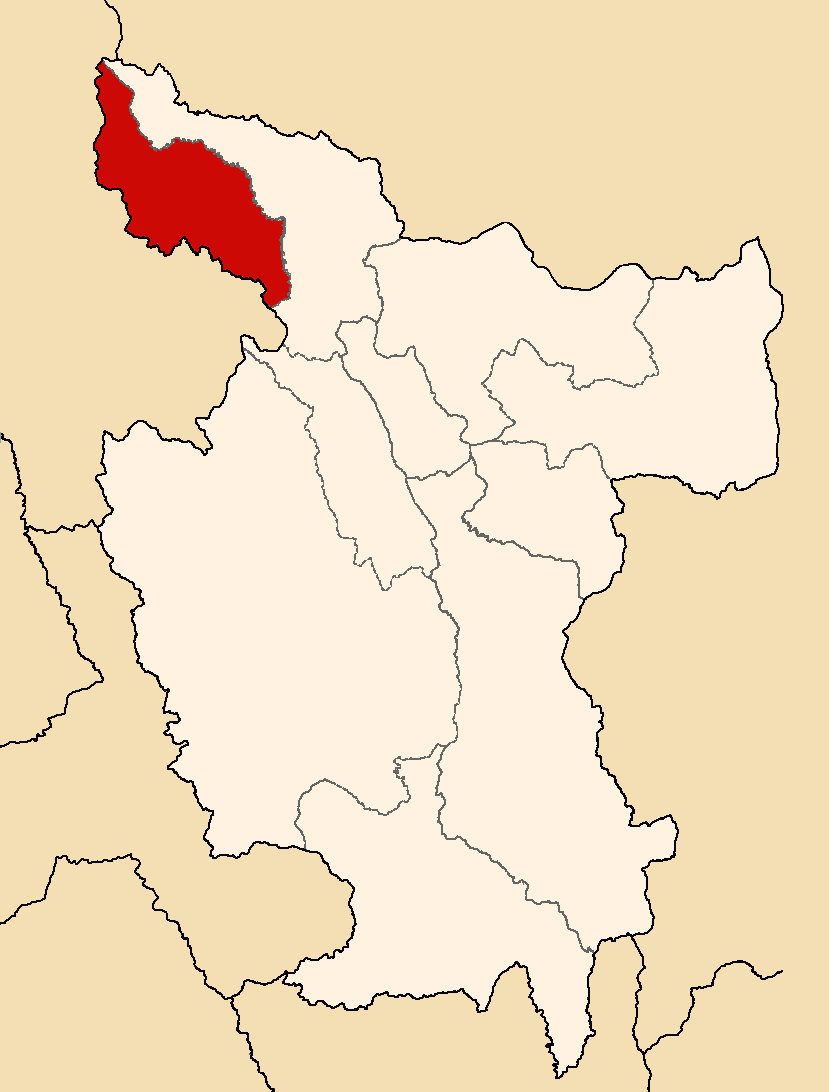
- Location of Rioja in the San Martín Region
- Country: Peru
- Region: San Martín
- Capital: Rioja

Area
  - Total: 2,535.04 km^{2} (978.78 sq mi)

Population (2002 estimate)
  - Total: 92.222
  - Density: 36.37/km^{2} (94.2/sq mi)
- UBIGEO: 2208

Rioja is one of ten provinces of the San Martín Region in northern Peru.

== Location ==
The province is bordered to the north and east by the province of Moyobamba and to the south and west by the Amazonas Region. The province has a population of 90,000 inhabitants. Its capital is Rioja. The area of the province is 2,535.04 square kilometers (978.78 sq mi).

== Political division ==
The province is divided into nine districts.

- Awajun (Bajo Naranjillo)
- Elias Soplin Vargas (Segunda Jerusalén)
- Nueva Cajamarca (Nueva Cajamarca)
- Pardo Miguel (Naranjos)
- Posic (Posic)
- Rioja (Rioja)
- San Fernando (San Fernando)
- Yorongos (Yorongos)
- Yuracyacu (Yuracyacu)
