= Elías Soplín Vargas District =

Coordinates: 5.9929°S 77.2836°W

Elias Soplin Vargas
- District
- Interactive map of Elias Soplin Vargas
- Country: Peru
- Region: San Martín
- Province: Rioja
- Founded: 26 December 1984
- Capital: Segunda Jerusalén

Government
  - Mayor: Jose Dilmer Saldaña Jara

Area
  - Total: 199.64 km^{2} (77.08 sq mi)
- Elevation: 825 m (2,707 ft)

Population (2017 census)
  - Total: 18,547
  - Density: 92.902/km^{2} (240.62/sq mi)
- Time zone: UTC-5 (PET)
- UBIGEO: 220803

Elias Soplin Vargas District is one of nine districts of the province Rioja in the Department of San Martín of Peru. The district capital is Segunda Jerusalén (Second Jerusalem).
