= Rioja District =

Coordinates: 6.0611°S 77.2017°W

Rioja
- District
- Interactive map of Rioja
- Country: Peru
- Region: San Martín
- Province: Rioja
- Time zone: UTC-5 (PET)

Rioja District is located in Rioja Province, Peru.

== Climate ==
Climate data for Rioja, elevation 823 m (2,700 ft), (1991–2020)
Month	Jan	Feb	Mar	Apr	May	Jun	Jul	Aug	Sep	Oct	Nov	Dec	Year
Mean daily maximum °C (°F)	28.2 (82.8)	28.0 (82.4)	28.2 (82.8)	28.5 (83.3)	28.7 (83.7)	28.5 (83.3)	28.6 (83.5)	29.2 (84.6)	29.5 (85.1)	29.4 (84.9)	29.2 (84.6)	28.6 (83.5)	28.7 (83.7)
Mean daily minimum °C (°F)	18.8 (65.8)	18.9 (66.0)	18.9 (66.0)	18.9 (66.0)	18.6 (65.5)	17.7 (63.9)	16.9 (62.4)	16.9 (62.4)	17.5 (63.5)	18.6 (65.5)	19.0 (66.2)	19.1 (66.4)	18.3 (65.0)
Average precipitation mm (inches)	128.5 (5.06)	169.6 (6.68)	188.6 (7.43)	150.5 (5.93)	118.5 (4.67)	56.3 (2.22)	56.6 (2.23)	70.3 (2.77)	91.5 (3.60)	150.2 (5.91)	141.8 (5.58)	143.1 (5.63)	1,465.5 (57.71)
Source: National Meteorology and Hydrology Service of Peru
