= Moyobamba =

Coordinates: 6°02′S 76°58′W

Moyobamba Muyupampa
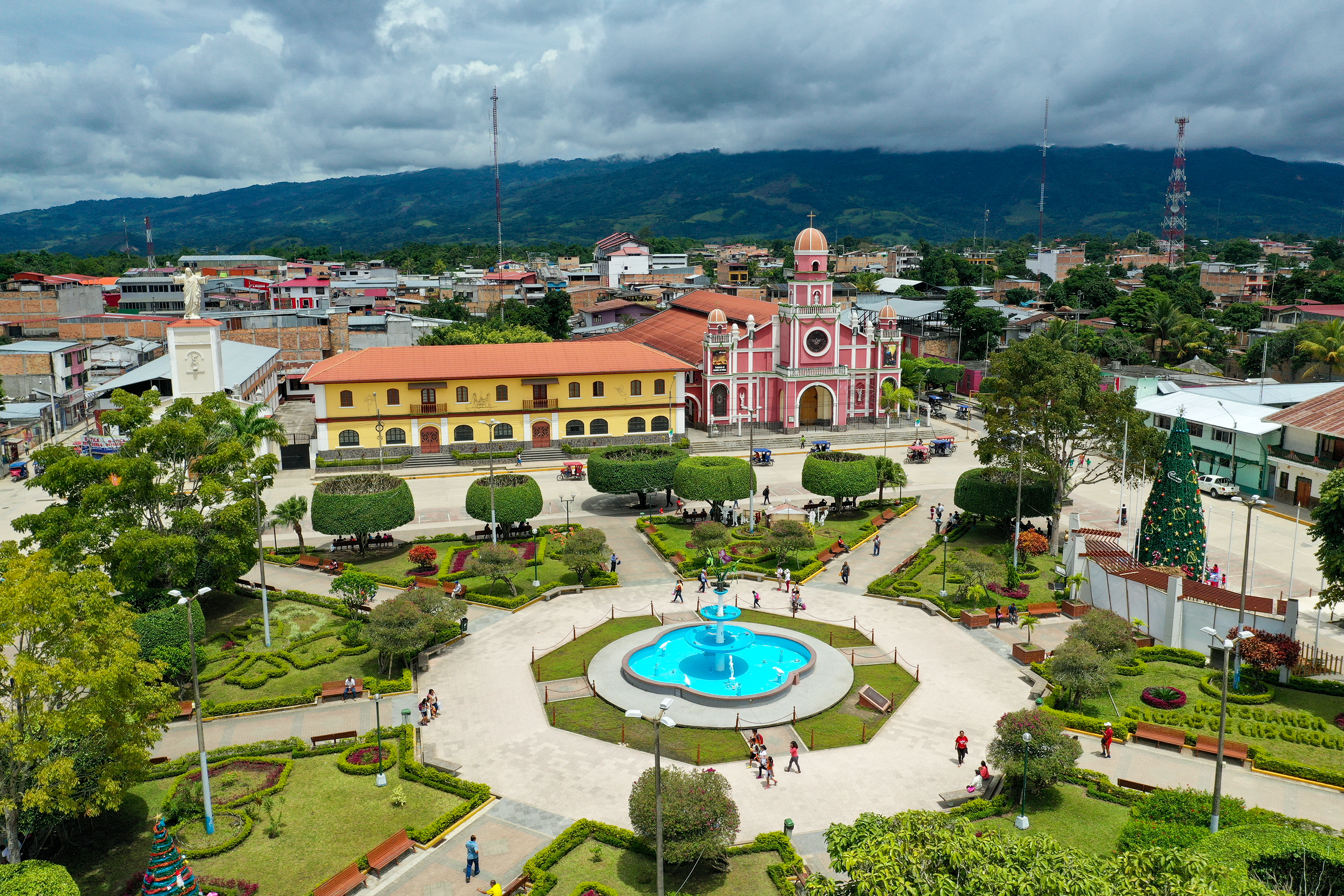
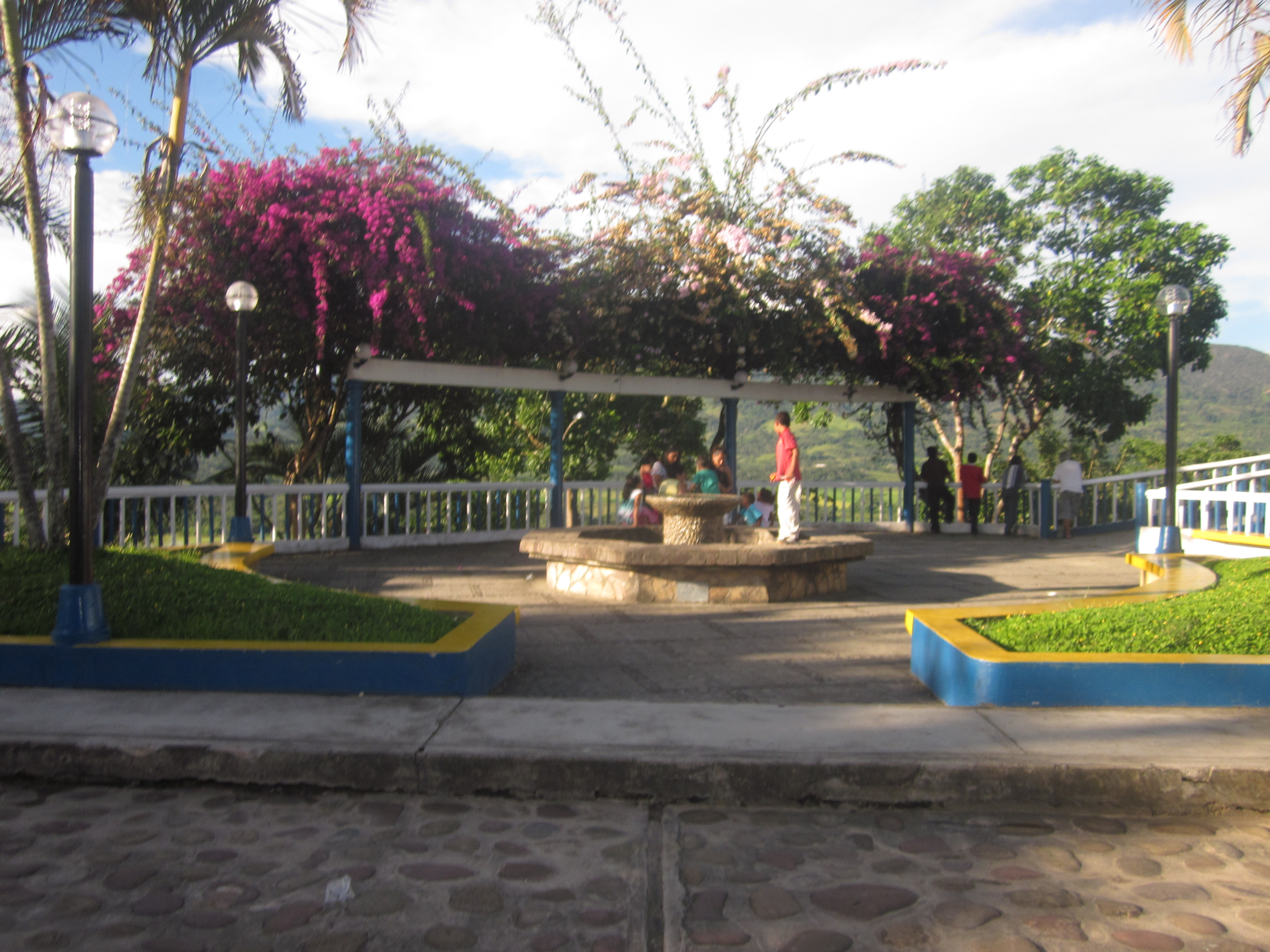
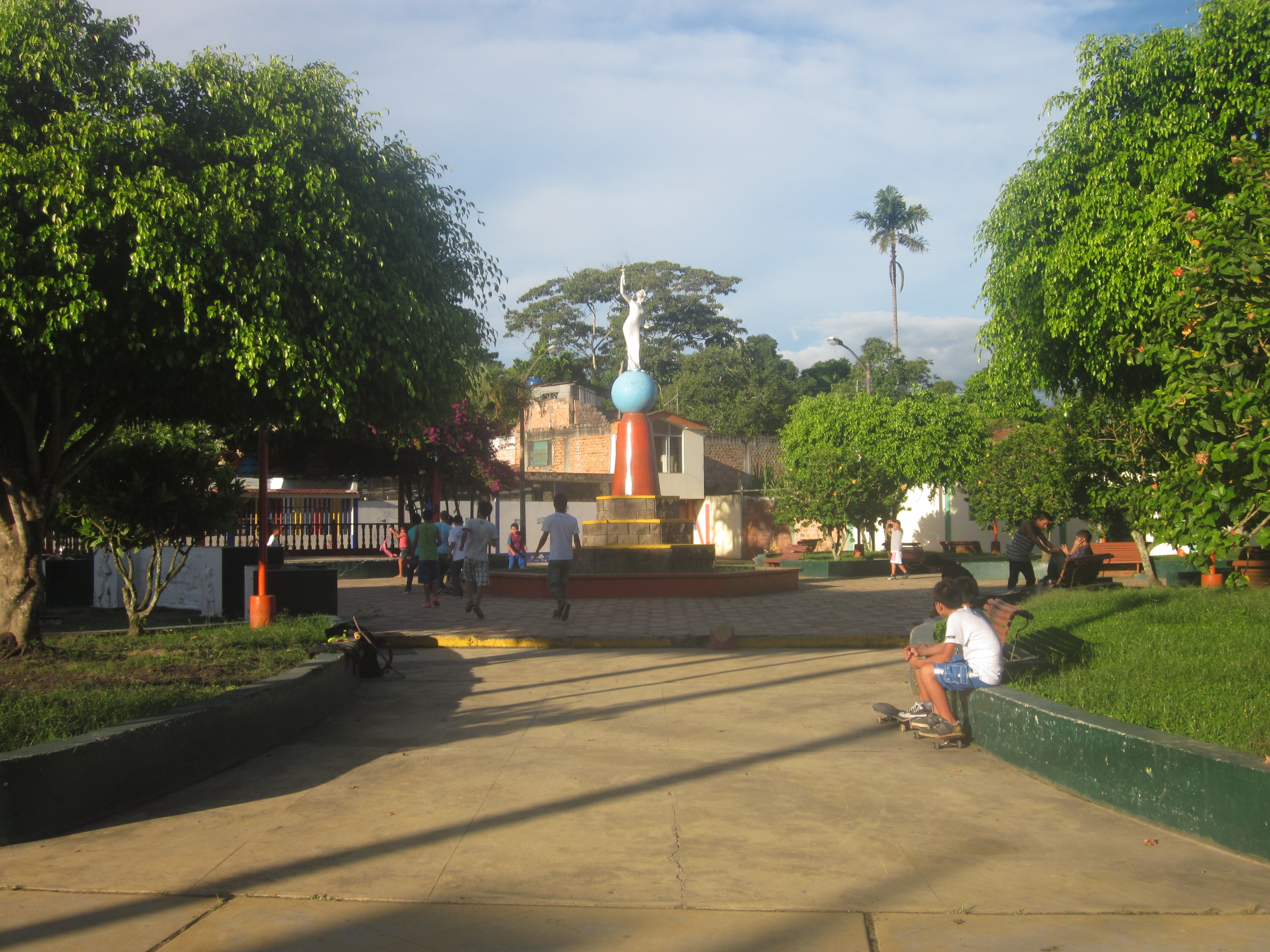
- From the top: Plaza de Armas, Punta de Tahuishco Stack, Liberty Square, Tahuishco Port, Moyobamba Cathedral

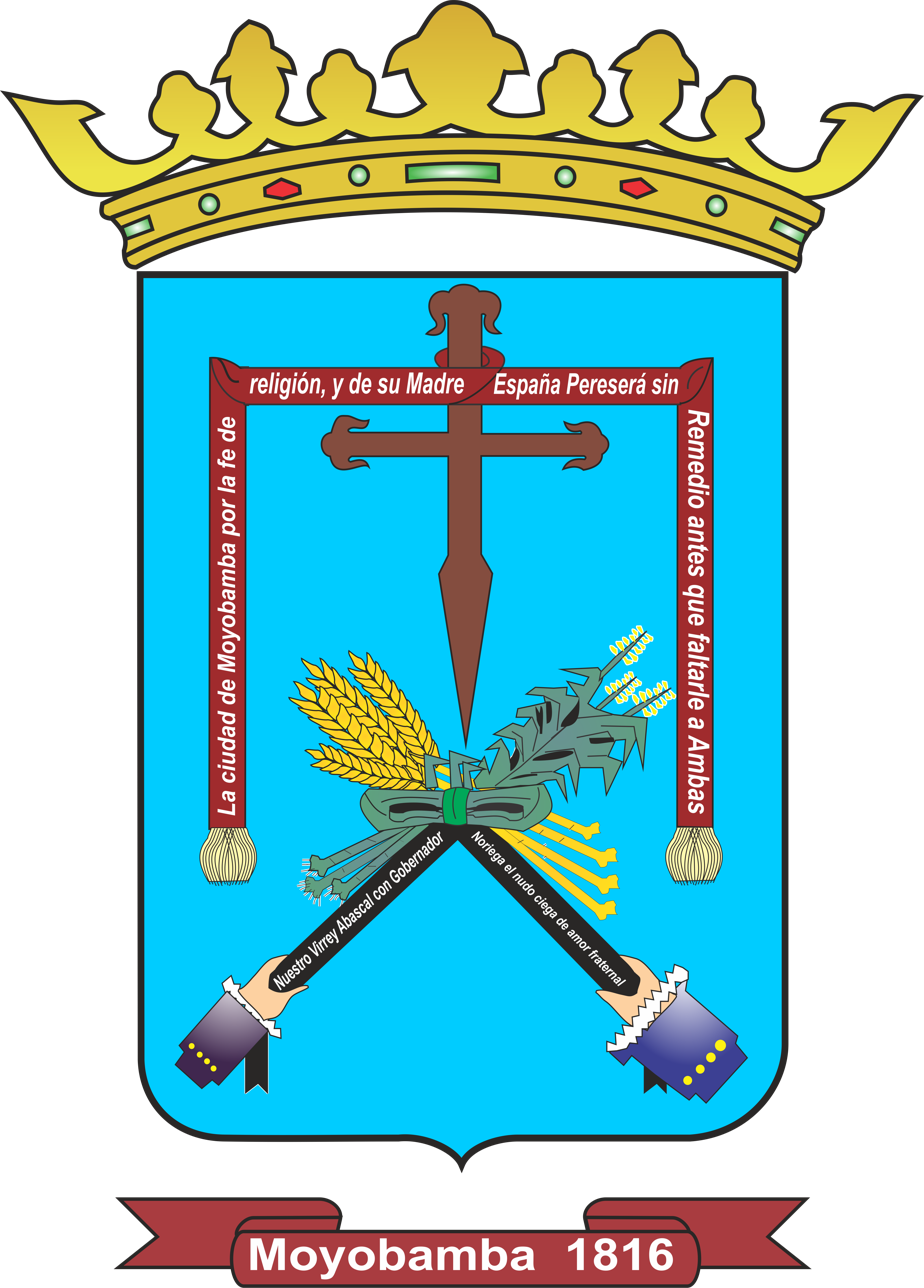
- Flag Seal
- Nicknames: Ciudad de las Orquídeas (City of Orchids); Antigua Capital de Maynas (Ancient Capital of Maynas); Cuna de la cultura del oriente peruano (Cradle of the Peruvian Oriental culture)
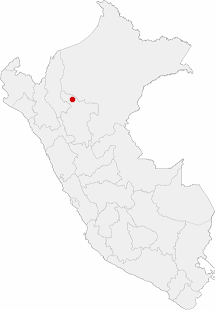
- Location of Moyobamba in Peru
- Country: Peru
- Region: San Martín
- Province: Moyobamba
- District: Moyobamba
- Founded: July 25, 1540
- Founder: Juan Pérez de Guevara

Government
  - Mayor: Gastelo Huamán Chinchay

Area
  - City: 2,129.86 km^{2} (822.34 sq mi)
- Elevation: 860 m (2,820 ft)

Population (2017)
  - City: 50,073
  - Estimate (2015): 56,452
  - Density: 23.510/km^{2} (60.891/sq mi)
  - Urban: 56,452
  - Metro: 56,452
- Demonym: Moyobambino/a
- Time zone: UTC-5 (PET)

Moyobamba (Spanish pronunciation: [moʝoˈβamba]) or Muyupampa (Quechua muyu circle, pampa large plain, "circle plain"), also called "Santiago of eight valleys of Moyobamba" or "Maynas capital", is the capital city of the San Martín Region in northern Peru. There are 50,073 inhabitants, according to the 2017 census. Some 3,500 species of orchids are native to the area, which has led to another of the city's nicknames , The City of Orchids. The city is the capital of both Moyobamba Province and Moyobamba District.

The city is linked by road with Tarapoto to the southeast, Rioja to the west and Bagua to the northwest. Roads connect Moyobamba to the Pacific coast by way of Bagua and Olmos to the north and Cajamarca to the southwest.

== History ==
The first colonies were from the Chachapoyas culture, but the modern city of Moyobamba was established by Juan Pérez de Guevara on 25 July 1540, who named it Santiago de los Ocho Valles de Moyobamba (Santiago of the eight Moyobamba Valleys). It was founded on the site of an Inca settlement and was the first city founded by the Spanish in the Peruvian Amazon. It is the second oldest Spanish town east of the Andes.

During the Spanish Conquest, Moyobamba was a base from which incursions were made into the surrounding areas.

The city was the seat of the first religious missions established in the region. The Roman Catholic Church used the city as a base, where it began the task of converting the natives to Christianity. It was an important commercial center during the colonial era (1533–1821) and it was given city status in 1857. The historic "Puerto de Tahuishco" was once a vibrant port along the Mayo River, but has since become one of the last waning vestiges of the river trade route.

On 7 June 1897, Moyobamba was made the capital of the Loreto Region. On 4 September 1906, it became the capital of the San Martín Region. It was named the seat of the Territorial Prelature of Moyobamba in 1948. On September 25, 2005, Moyobamba was affected by the 2005 northern Peru earthquake.

== Geography ==
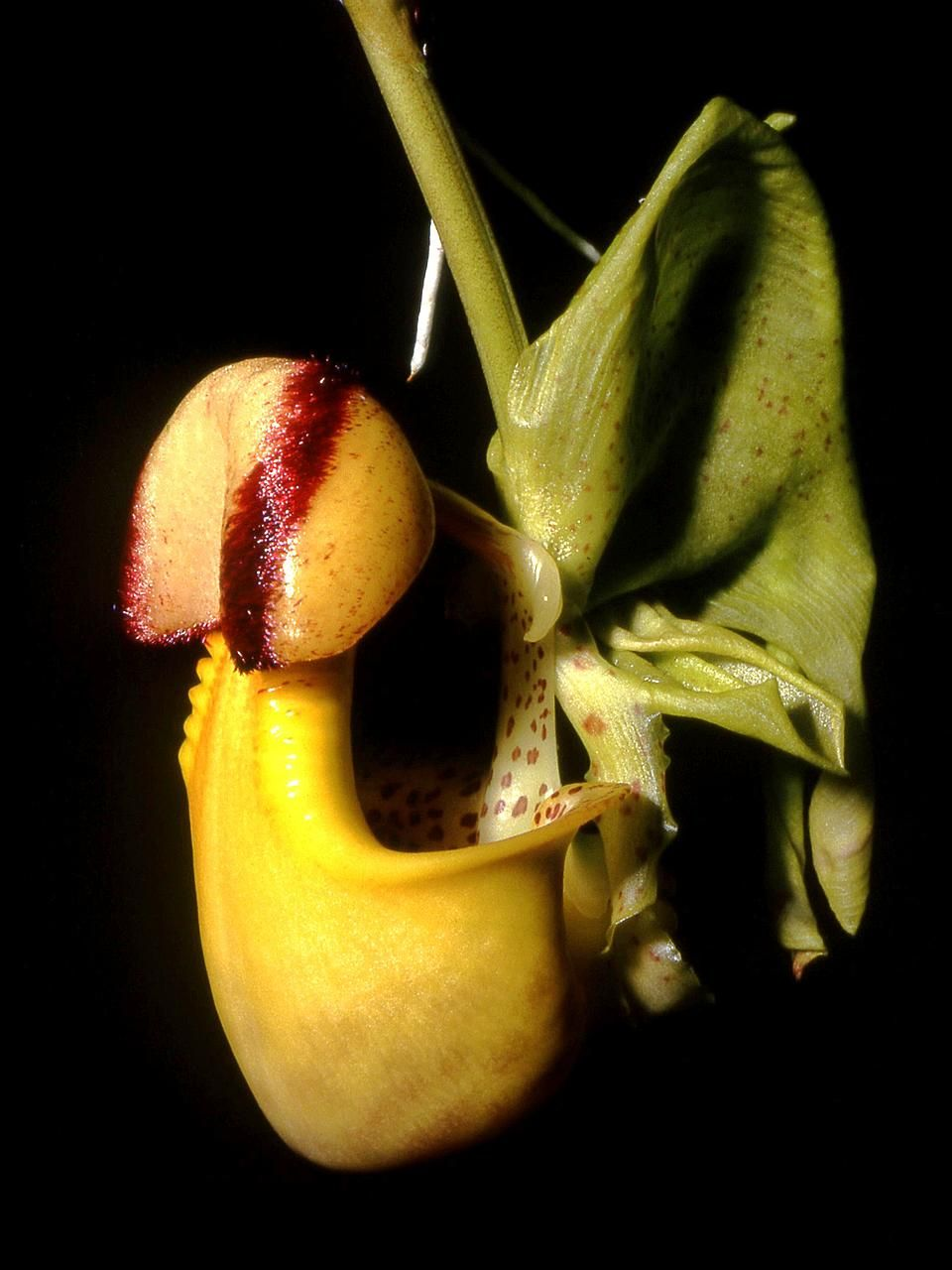
Coryanthes macrantha Moyobamba is famous for its large number of native Orchids

The city sits on a bluff overlooking the Mayo River, at 2,820 feet (860 m) above sea level, in the humid, tropical region known as the Ceja de selva.

Native Orchids are the most famous of the Moyobamba flora.

The surrounding area consists of rivers, caves, waterfalls, hot springs and lakes. These include the Tioyacu River and the subterranean river in the cave of the Huacharos (Cueva de los Huacharos), the natural hot springs at San Mateo, the Laguna Azul lake, the Ahuashiyacu and the Gera waterfalls.

=== Climate ===
Moyobamba has a tropical climate of rainy, very warm and humid savanna. The temperature varies between 14 °C or 57.2 °F (minimum) and 30 °C or 86 °F (maximum), 22 °C or 71.6 °F being the average temperature throughout the year. On some nights in Moyobamba it is cooler.

Climate data for Moyobamba, elevation 879 m (2,884 ft), (1991–2020)
| Month | Jan | Feb | Mar | Apr | May | Jun | Jul | Aug | Sep | Oct | Nov | Dec | Year |
|---|---|---|---|---|---|---|---|---|---|---|---|---|---|
| Mean daily maximum °C (°F) | 27.9 (82.2) | 27.7 (81.9) | 28.0 (82.4) | 28.4 (83.1) | 28.6 (83.5) | 28.3 (82.9) | 28.5 (83.3) | 29.2 (84.6) | 29.4 (84.9) | 29.2 (84.6) | 29.2 (84.6) | 28.1 (82.6) | 28.5 (83.4) |
| Mean daily minimum °C (°F) | 19.1 (66.4) | 19.2 (66.6) | 19.2 (66.6) | 19.2 (66.6) | 18.9 (66.0) | 18.1 (64.6) | 17.4 (63.3) | 17.4 (63.3) | 18.0 (64.4) | 18.9 (66.0) | 19.4 (66.9) | 19.4 (66.9) | 18.7 (65.6) |
| Average precipitation mm (inches) | 131.0 (5.16) | 170.1 (6.70) | 178.0 (7.01) | 126.0 (4.96) | 97.8 (3.85) | 59.6 (2.35) | 53.6 (2.11) | 66.4 (2.61) | 90.0 (3.54) | 126.9 (5.00) | 126.1 (4.96) | 146.0 (5.75) | 1,371.5 (54) |
Source: National Meteorology and Hydrology Service of Peru

== Demographics ==
The demographics of Moyobamba is a mix of cultures and people of different origins. The european group includes people from Spain and Italy with smaller groups of people from Armenia, Syria, Germany, and Poland and forms 70 percent of the population; the "mixed people" (amerindian with european) form 25 percent of total population. The remaining 5 percent of the population includes Chinese, Japanese, Quechua and other amerindians (amazonian groups), and people of black origins.

One small group people, descendants of Armenians, Jews, and Germans have the higher education and economic rate in the city; many of their members emigrated from Moyobamba to other areas and are very active in politics, economy, trade and education in largest cities of Peru (like Lima, Trujillo, Arequipa, Ica and Chiclayo).

== Economy ==
Moyobamba is the center of a large agricultural region and one of the major trading centers for the Aguaruna Native Communities which inhabit the surrounding valley known as the Upper Mayo River Valley. The most lucrative crops grown in the region include rice, coffee, and corn. Cotton, sugarcane, tobacco and cocoa are also produced.

Alcohol, liquor, wines, and straw hats are produced in the city.

Hot springs, gold, and some petroleum are found nearby.

After the slow demise of its airport, this regional capital began to fall behind the faster-developing Tarapoto, a neighboring city further down-river. Farmers and regional government workers often clash in a geopolitical battle over local control and access to outside markets.

== Festivities ==
=== Fiesta de San Juan ===
"Moyobambinos" (residents of Moyobamba) celebrate the region's patron saint (San Juan - Saint John) every year on June 24. Locals celebrate with traditional dances and dishes, most notably Juane, a dish that is meant to resemble the head of John the Baptist on a platter before Herod Antipas. It is made by stuffing a ball of sticky green rice with chicken and wrapping it in bijao (Heliconia bihai) leaves for cooking. Then celebrants dance the "Pandilla" around wooden poles dug into the ground before chopping them down with an axe and collecting the treasures from the top.

== Sister cities ==
- Arequipa, Peru
- Bilbao, Spain
- Iquitos, Peru
- Loja, Ecuador
- Manaus, Brazil
- Toledo, Spain
