= Moyobamba province =

Coordinates: 6°01′48″S 76°58′12″W

Moyobamba
- Province
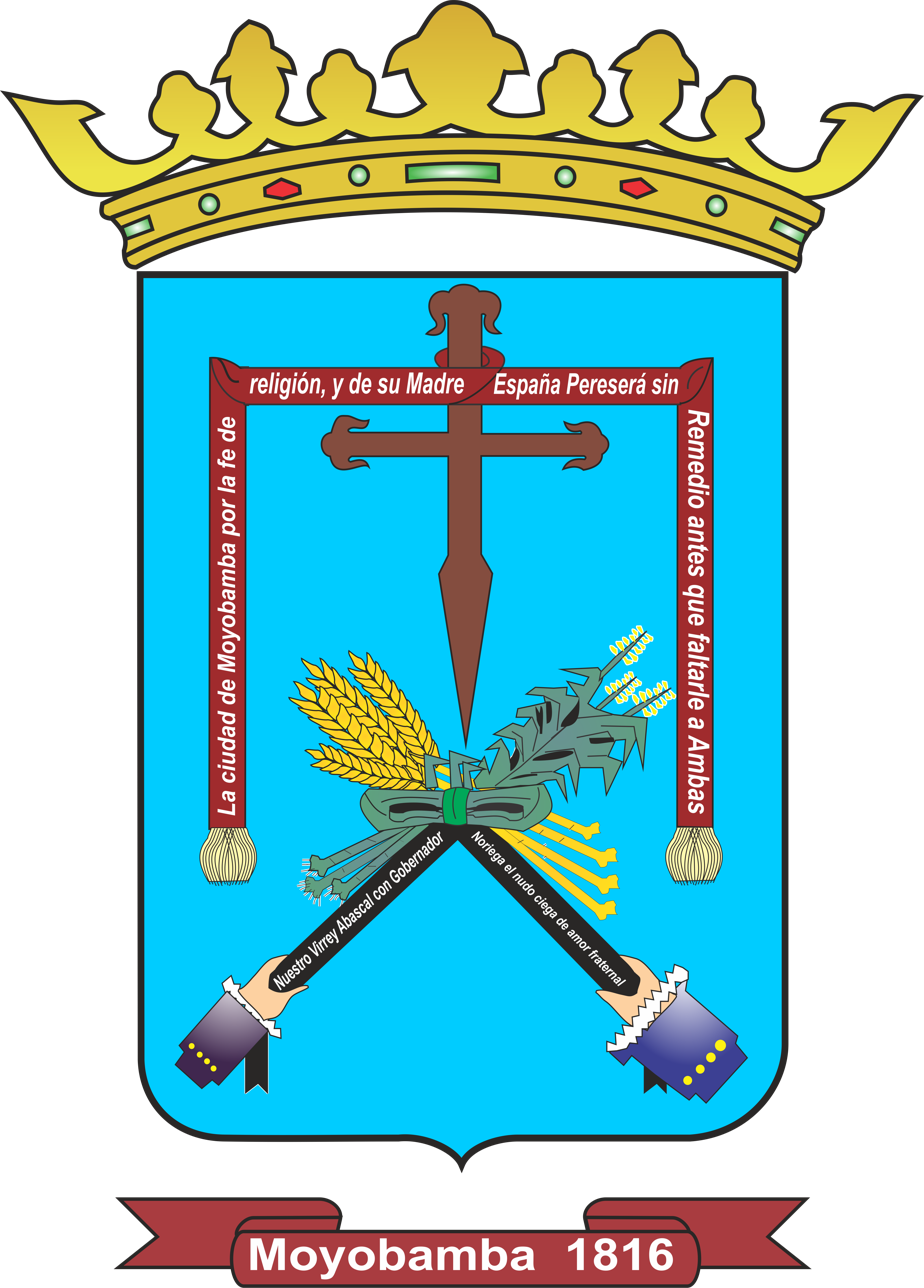
- Flag Coat of arms

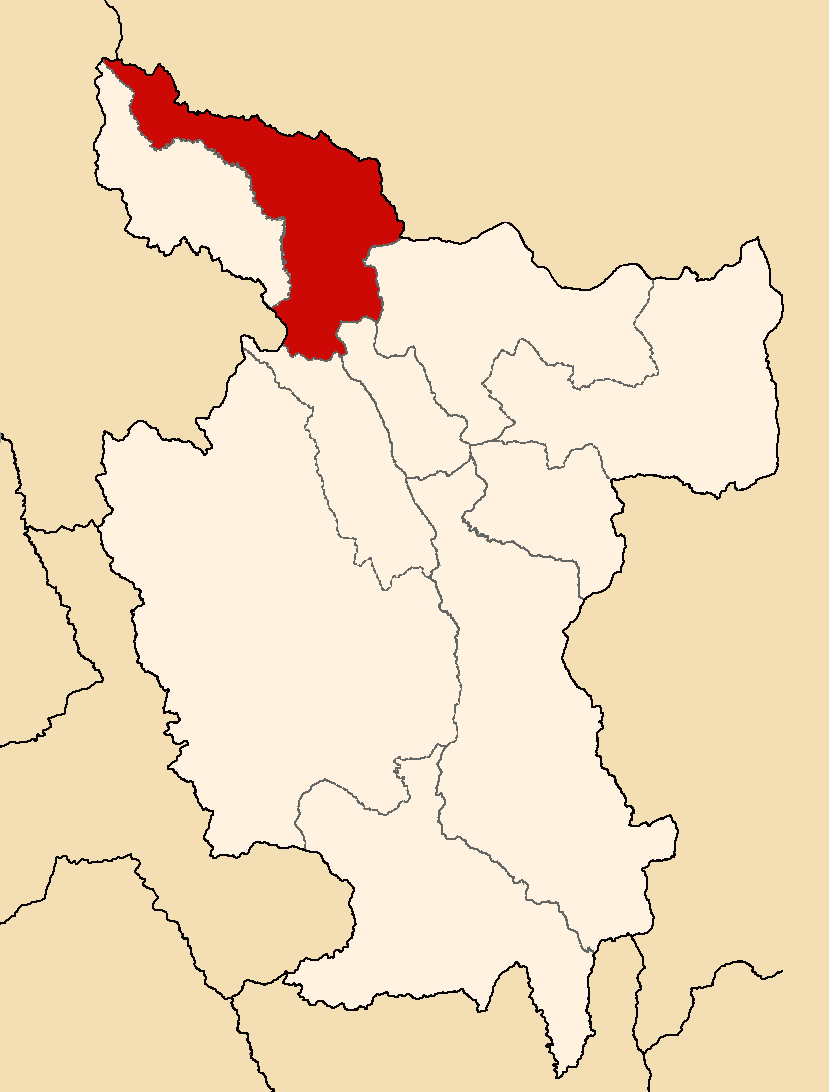
- Location of Moyobamba in the San Martín Region
- Country: Peru
- Region: San Martín
- Capital: Moyobamba

Government
  - Mayor: Gastelo Huamán Chinchay

Area
  - Total: 3,772.31 km^{2} (1,456.50 sq mi)

Population
  - Total: 122,365
  - Density: 32.4377/km^{2} (84.0132/sq mi)
- UBIGEO: 2201

Moyobamba is one of ten provinces of the San Martín Region in northern Peru.

== Political division ==
The province is divided into six districts.

- Calzada (Calzada)
- Habana (Habana)
- Jepelacio (Jepelacio)
- Moyobamba (Moyobamba)
- Soritor (Soritor)
- Yantalo (Yantalo)
