= Mayo River (Peru) =

Coordinates: 6.4178°S 76.2800°W

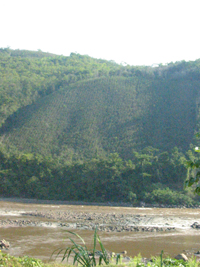
A picture of the Mayo River as it flows through the village of Solo

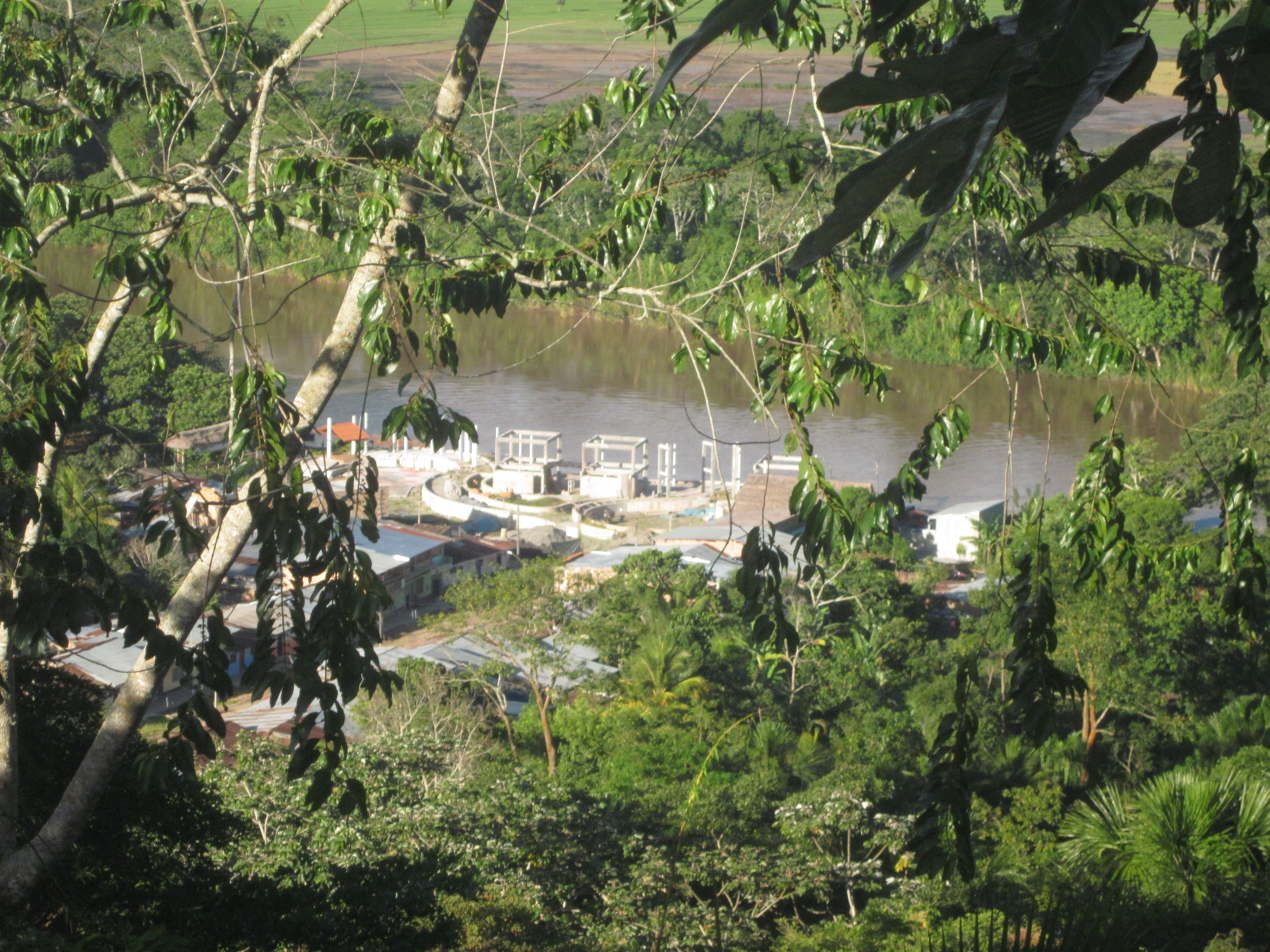
Tahuishco port on Mayo River at Moyobamba

The Mayo River lies in northern Peru and flows near the city of Moyobamba.

Mayo River is also another name for Chinchipe River, that flows in the same general area.
