= Department of San Martín =

Department of Peru

San Martín
- Department
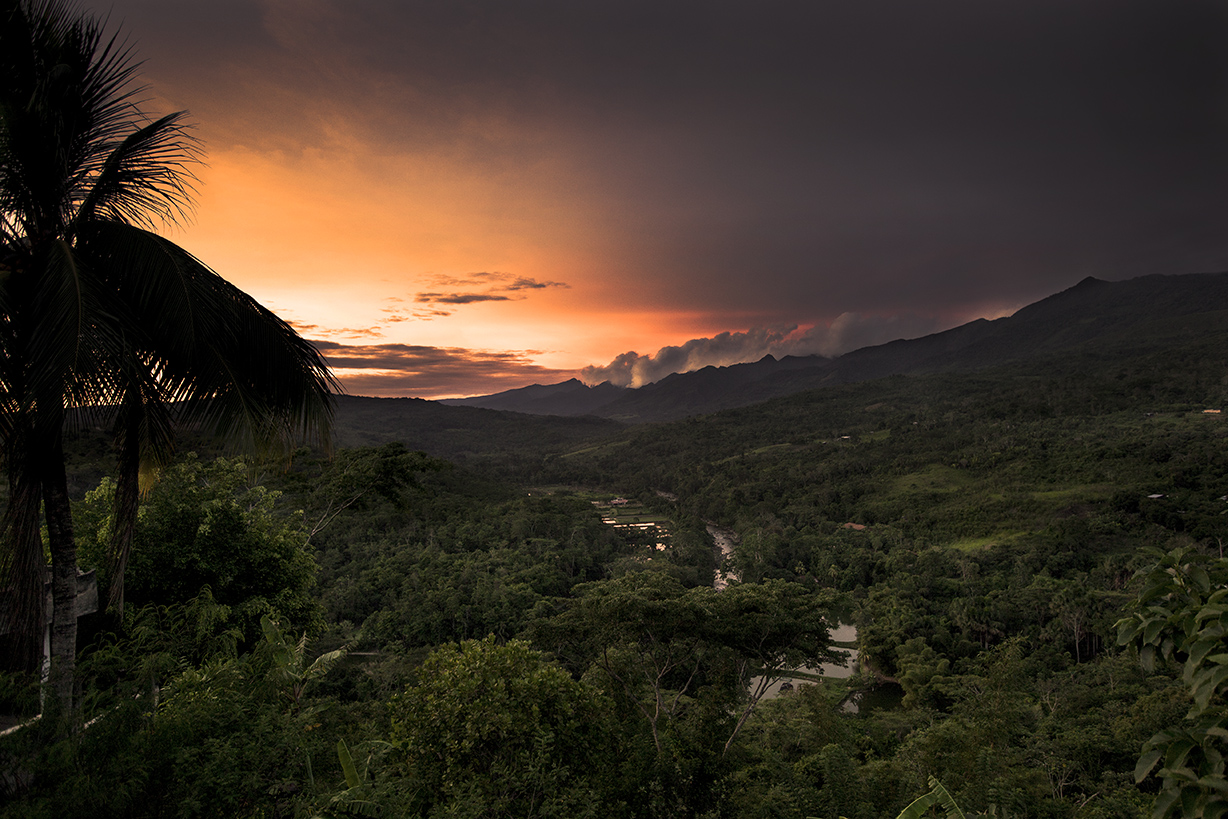
- View of the Cumbaza River

- Flag Coat of arms

- Location of San Martín within Peru
- Coordinates: 7.2°S 76.8°W
- Country: Peru
- Capital: Moyobamba
- Largest city: Tarapoto
- Provinces: List: Bellavista; El Dorado; Huallaga; Lamas; Mariscal Cáceres; Moyobamba; Picota; Rioja; San Martín; Tocache

Government
  - Type: Regional Government
  - Body: Regional Council
  - Governor: Pedro Bogarín Vargas

Area
  - Total: 51,250 km^{2} (19,790 sq mi)
- Highest elevation: 3,080 m (10,100 ft)
- Lowest elevation: 190 m (620 ft)

Population (2025 census)
  - Total: 968,472
  - Density: 18.90/km^{2} (48.94/sq mi)
- Demonym: sanmartinense
- UBIGEO: 22
- Dialing code: 042
- ISO 3166 code: PE-SAM
- Principal resources: Coffee, rice, yucca, cocoa, tobacco, cebu cattle.
- Poverty rate: 62.4%
- Percentage of Peru's GDP: 1.85%
- Website: www.gob.pe/regionsanmartin

San Martín (Spanish pronunciation: [sam maɾˈtin]) is a department of Peru. Located in the country's north, most of the department is located in the upper part of the Peruvian Amazon rainforest. It is administered by a regional government. Its capital is Moyobamba and the largest city in the department is Tarapoto. San Martín is named after the Argentine general and independence hero, José de San Martín, who liberated the country from the Spanish in 1821.

== Geography ==
=== Boundaries ===
- North and East: Loreto Region
- South: Huánuco Region
- West: La Libertad and Amazonas regions

=== Morphology ===
The territory of San Martín can be divided into four morphological zones:

- the west, near the eastern side of the Andean Plateau, with a rough topography and many ravines;
- the zone of the wide valleys, with stepped terraces formed by the Huallaga River and its affluents, where population is engaged mainly in cattle and agriculture;
- the southwest zone, with a relief coming down from the Cordillera Azul, with low elevation, where is an impressive canyon known as Cajón de Sión, which finishes in the Cayumba rapids;
- a small lower-lying jungle zone with areas easily flooded and with almost no hills.

The Huallaga River is one of the most important rivers in the region. It forms, together with its tributaries a hydrographical system which drains all of the region's territory. The Pongo de Aguirre is an important canyon formed by the Huallaga going through the Andean hills.

=== Environment ===
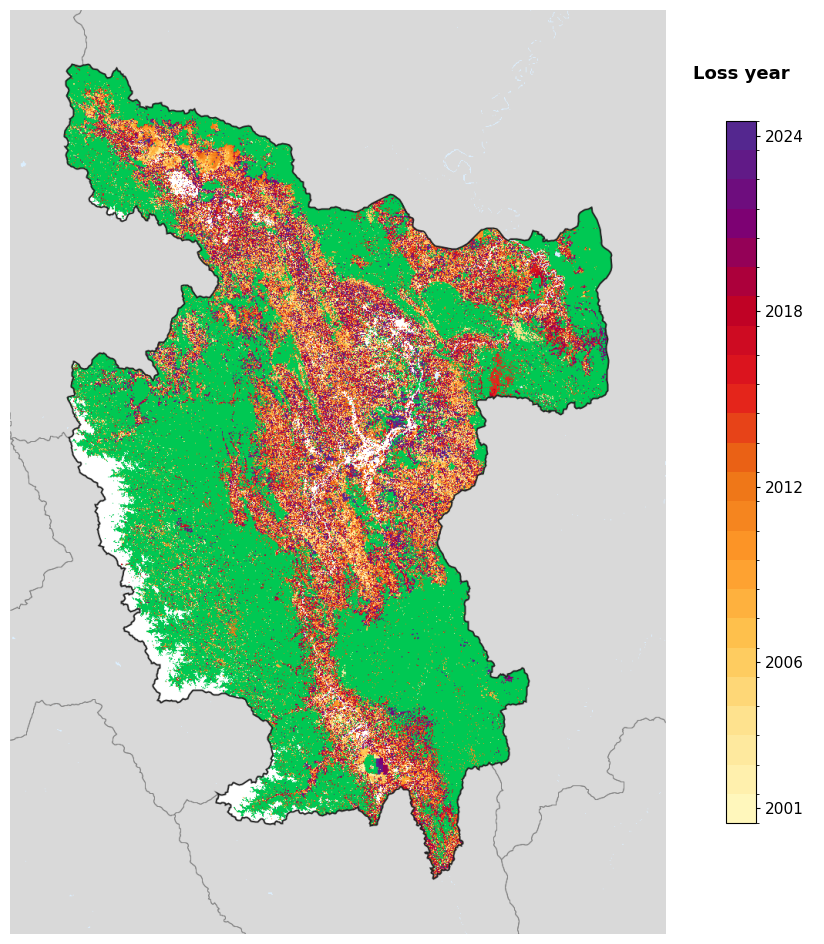
Tree-cover loss year in San Martín, 2001-2024, from the Global Forest Change dataset.

In San Martín, Conservation International Peru lists an office in Rioja and leads the Alto Mayo Protected Forest Conservation Initiative in the Alto Mayo Protection Forest.

== History ==
Tupac Yupanqui entered and subdued the Inca dominion, the province of Moyobamba, known back then by its native name, Muyupampa. In 1539, Spaniard Alonso de Alvarado reached the Mayo River and founded a city he named Santiago de los Valles de Moyobamba, which later became the capital of Maynas. Another important personality was Priest Manuel Sobreviela who, between 1787 and 1790, accomplished traveling across the Huallaga River and subsequently published a map named "Planning for the course of the Huallaga and Ucayali Rivers and for the Pampa del Sacramento".

On August 19, 1821, Moyobamba was the first Peruvian city in declaring its independence.

The construction of a highway in recent years has increased the exchange of different products, benefitting the economy of this region.

== Political division ==
Map of provinces

The region is divided into 10 provinces (Spanish: provincias, singular: provincia), which are composed of 78 districts (distritos, singular: distrito).

The provinces, with their capitals in parentheses, are:

- Bellavista (Bellavista)
- El Dorado (San José de Sisa)
- Huallaga (Saposoa)
- Lamas (Lamas)
- Mariscal Cáceres (Juanjuí)
- Moyobamba (Moyobamba)
- Picota (Picota)
- Rioja (Rioja)
- San Martín (Tarapoto)
- Tocache (Tocache)

== Archaeology ==
Gran Pajáten is a pre Inca complex of circular slate buildings decorated with figures of flying condors situated on the border with La Libertad. Due to its difficult access, tourism is not yet possible at the site.

== See also ==
- Rio Abiseo National Park
- Regional Museum of the National University of San Martin (Museo Regional de la Universidad Nacional de San Martín)
