= Sauce (disambiguation) =

A sauce is a liquid condiment or accompaniment to food. Sauce or The Sauce may also refer to:

== Geography ==
- Sauce Department, Corrientes Province, Argentina
  - Sauce, Corrientes, a town, capital of the department
- El Sauce, El Salvador, La Unión, El Salvador a municipality
- El Sauce, Nicaragua, León, Nicaragua, a town and municipality
- Sauce District, San Martin Province, Peru
- Lake Sauce, Peru
- Sawsi, also spelled Sauce, a mountain in Peru
- Sauce, Uruguay, a city and municipality in the Canelones Department

== Music ==
- The Sauce, the first solo album by Eddie Spaghetti of The Supersuckers
- "Sauce", a song on the 2018 album Man of the Woods by Justin Timberlake
- "The Sauce", a song from the 2000 album AOI: Bionix by De La Soul
- "SAUCE!", a song from the 2019 album Members Only, Vol. 4 by late rapper XXXTENTACION

== People ==
- Ángel Sauce (1911–1995), Venezuelan composer and violinist
- Sauce Gardner (born 2000), American football player
- Daniel Merrett (born 1984), former Australian rules footballer nicknamed "Sauce"
- Curtis "Sauce" Wilson, a member of the now-defunct R&B group Somethin' for the People

== Other uses ==
- Standard Architecture for Universal Comment Extensions, or SAUCE, a software protocol
- Sauce, a colloquial term for alcoholic beverages
- Internet slang for "source", often used when requesting the source of an image or other posted material
- Battle of El Sauce, a 1932 battle during the American occupation of Nicaragua
- The Sauce, a television series that aired on Fuse TV from 2007 to 2008

== See also ==
- Laguna del Sauce, a lake in Uruguay
- Saus, Catalonia, Spain
- Source (disambiguation)
