= Quinto Inuma Alvarado =

Quechua chief and conservationist (c.1973–2023)

- Quinto Inuma Alvarado on 11 October 2019
- Born: 1972 or 1973
- Died: November 29, 2023 (aged 50); Huimbayoc District, San Martín Province, Peru
- Cause of death: Assassination by gunshot
- Occupations: Tribal leader; Conservationist
- Title: Apu of Santa Rosillo de Yanayacu Indigenous Community
- Spouse: Bety Marlith Mandruma Flores

Quinto Inuma Alvarado (c. 1973 – 29 November 2023) was a Kichwa tribal leader from Peru. He was the apu of the Santa Rosillo de Yanayacu indigenous community and one of the leading environmental defenders of the Department of San Martín. He was assassinated in 2023.

Throughout his life, Inuma fought against the deforestation of the Amazon rainforest in the Quechua lands. He denounced illegal logging and drug trafficking and advocated for legal protection of the Lower Huallaga region. He faced threats from loggers and drug traffickers. The Peruvian State assumed responsibility for his defense, but lacked the necessary resources to put his security into action. On 29 November 2023, while returning home from an environmental conference in Pucallpa, Inuma was shot three times and killed.

== Career ==
Location of Santa Rosillo de Yanayacu in Peru

From 2006 to 2014, Inuma worked as a park ranger at the Servicio Nacional de Áreas Naturales Protegidas, at Cordillera Azul National Park.

In 2017, Quinto Inuma Alvarado became vice apu of the Santa Rosillo de Yanayacu indigenous community, with his brother Manuel Inuma Alvarado serving as apu. He frequently denounced the logging of tree species in the Huimbayoc area, which made him the target of threats and violence. He advocated for the titling of his community and the preservation of forests in indigenous communities.

In July 2021, representatives of the Tarapoto Provincial Office Specialized in Crimes of Illicit Drug Trafficking entered the community in response to complaints against illegal loggers and cocaleros. In response, he was beaten and received death threats by cocaleros. He was evacuated by plane. After the website SERVINDI disseminated images of the injuries inflicted on Inuma, he temporarily took refuge in Tarapoto to protect his and his family's safety. He spent two months there, arranged by the Ministry of Justice. Inuma chose to remain in his community, believing he should not be given protection while others who received threats did not. The same year, an article by the Forest Peoples Programme discussed this situation in Santa Rosillo and the nearby Anak Kurutuyacu community.

Quinto and Manuel Inuma led a group of indigenous forest patrollers. Inuma did not believe the authorities would help. Inuma received a grant from the Socio-Environmental Fund of Peru to improve monitoring of the forests using GPS. While patrolling a camp on 10 October 2023, he heard what he believed were warning shots. He cut his patrol short after a phone call warned him about state patrollers following him.

On 15 November 2023, he addressed the Supraprovincial Criminal Prosecutor's Office Specialized in Human Rights and Interculturalism about threats in his community, and he requested a state of emergency for his community. He was guaranteed measures of protection. The Peruvian State assumed responsibility of protecting him under the Intersectoral Mechanism for the Protection of Human Rights Defenders. Directorial Resolution No. 003-2021-JUS/DGDH formally guaranteed his personal security. It mandated police surveillance and protection, which was not put into action. According to attorney Cristina del Rosario Gavancho, "The mechanism was impossible to put into practice."

== Assassination ==
According to Inuma's eldest son, Kevin Arnol Inuma Madruma, loggers "told him they were going to kill him because he had made a report... They've tried to kill him several times." Inuma participated in a workshop of environmental defenders in Pucallpa from 23 to 27 November 2023. The workshop focused on knowledge transfer between Kichwa women to help defend land. During this meeting, he said in one of his final statements:

Retirarnos de la comunidad previno un atentado de muerte, pero nuestros hermanos están solos. Pedimos regresar para defender nuestra tierra. Si debo morir, moriré.
Our withdrawal from the community prevented an attempt on our lives, but our siblings are alone. We request to go back to defend our land. If I must die, I will die.

Inuma was assassinated on the evening of 29 November 2023, while returning home from Pucallpa. He last saw Kevin at 3 a.m., when he departed for Tarapoto through Huimbayoc District, where he arrived at 10 a.m. He arrived at the settlement of San José de Yanayacu, where he boarded a boat to his community. Six family members were on the boat, including his wife Bety Marlith Mandruma Flores, his second son Jeanpiere, his niece Axceldina Barbarán Tapullima, and his nephew Meister Inuma Pérez, who served as the vice apu.

One and a half hours before arriving to the community, the boat was intercepted near a creek called Bayada. Hooded individuals knocked down a tree to block the boat. Inuma, who had been driving the boat, got up and analyzed how to avoid the obstacle, when he was shot three times. The bullet shells wounded Barbarán Tapullima in the leg, buttock, and rib. She and the other occupants returned home on horseback and carried Inuma's body.

=== Reactions ===
The Ministries of the Interior, Environment, Justice and Human Rights, and Culture issued a joint statement calling the attack "cowardly" and saying, "We will continue working hard against the illegal activities that destroy our forests and ecosystems and threaten the lives and integrity of all Peruvians." The Interethnic Association for the Development of the Peruvian Rainforest called for the state to implement "intersectoral mechanisms to guarantee the personal integrity and life of those who work every day to protect their ancestral territories against the worst aggressors." The Coordinating Committee for the Development and Defence of Indigenous Peoples in the San Martin Region said:.

Responsabilizamos en primer lugar de su asesinato al Estado peruano en su conjunto y a su estructura fragmentada que no es capaz de atender la seguridad de una vida... y la cohesión colectiva de una comunidad que lucha por sus bosques, su título comunal...
We place responsibility for the assassination on the Peruvian State and on its fragmented structure that is not capable of caring for the safety of a life... and the cohesion of a community that fights for its forests and its land titling...

Marisol García Apagueño, the president of the Federation of Indigenous Kechua Chazuta Amazonian Peoples, said in a statement:

La muerte de nuestro líder que luchaba por la titularidad de su territorio no debe quedar impune. El Ministerio Público debe investigar y sancionar a los culpables, y el gobierno debe dar seguridad jurídica a nuestra comunidad. La comunidad nativa Santa Rosillo de Yanayacu viene solicitando desde hace muchos años que el Bajo Huallaga sea declarado en emergencia ante el incremento del narcotráfico que viene afectando gravemente los derechos de los pueblos indígenas.
The death of our leader who fought for the titling of his territory cannot remain unpunished. The Public Ministry must investigate and sanction those responsible, and the government must provide legal certainty for our community. For many years, the native community of Santa Rosillo de Yanayacu has been requesting that the Lower Huallaga be declared an emergency due to the increase in drug trafficking that gravely affects the rights of indigenous people.

The Office of the United Nations High Commissioner for Human Rights said:

Condenamos el asesinato del defensor y apu Quinto Inuma. Expresamos condolencias a la familia y a la comunidad nativa Santa Rosillo de Yanayacu. Llamamos a las autoridades a garantizar una investigación pronta de los hechos.
We condemn the assassination of the defender and apu Quinto Inuma. We express our condolences to his family and the native community of Santa Rosillo de Yanayacu. We call upon the authorities to guarantee a prompt examination of the facts.

=== Investigation ===
The investigation of the assassination was conducted by the Specialized Prosecutor's Office in Environmental Matters of Alto Amazonas. The provincial prosecutor Berta Rengifo Vásquez was in charge.

On 12 February 2024, at the Third Supraprovincial Prosecutor's Office Against Organized Crime, Genix Saboya Saboya confessed that he had shot Inuma in the back for a payment of 1000 soles from Segundo Villalobos Guevara, whom Inuma had denounced for illegal logging in Santa Rosillo. Genix named his uncle, Belustiano Saboya Pisco, as the one who fatally shot Inuma in the head.

On 20 July 2025, Belustiano Saboya Pisco was killed by police in the town of Orellana. Police said that Saboya had attacked them with a machete when they attempted to take him into custody.

On 24 August 2026, after a trial lasting eight months, four men - Segundo Villalobos Guevara, Genix Saboya Saboya, Limber Ríos Ruiz, and Jerly Saboya Saboya - were found guilty of Inuma's murder. The following day, Ríos and Genix Saboya were sentenced to 35 years in prison, Villalobos to 28 years, and Jerly Saboya to 15 years. A fifth defendant, Dedicación Vera Pardo, was acquitted of obstruction of justice.

== Legacy ==
At the Hatun Tupanakuy for Climate Justice, celebrated in Cusco on 14 and 15 June 2024, Member of Congress Ruth Luque, president of the Committee on Environment and Ecology of Andean, Amazonian, and Afro-Peruvian Peoples, posthumously paid tribute to several environmental leaders, including Inuma.

== See also ==
- List of environmental killings
- Edwin Chota
- Ruth Buendía
