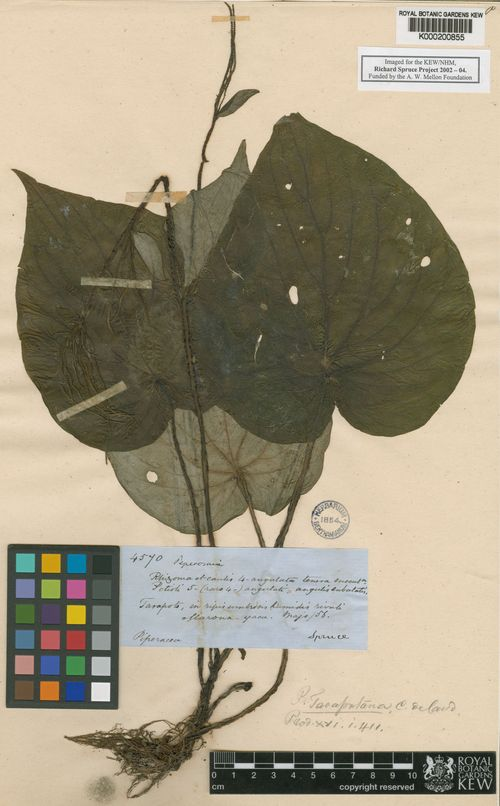

Scientific classification
- Kingdom: Plantae
- Clade: Embryophytes
- Clade: Tracheophytes
- Clade: Angiosperms
- Clade: Magnoliids
- Order: Piperales
- Family: Piperaceae
- Genus: Peperomia
- Species: P. tarapotana

Binomial name
- Peperomia tarapotana C.DC.

= Peperomia tarapotana =

Species of flowering plant

Peperomia tarapotana is a species of flowering plant in the genus Peperomia. It was first described by Casimir de Candolle and published in the book "Journal of Botany, British and Foreign 4: 137. 1866". The species name came from Tarapoto, where first specimens of this species were collected. It is endemic to Peru.

== Description ==
It is asymmetrical, glabrous, dry, membranous, pellucid, 10-veined, axillary, terminal 3-5 approaching, above surface, long-petiolate, ovate-cordate, apex acuminate, base cordate. A stoloniferous plant with a 0.14 cm -long petiole and a 0.12 cm-long leaf edge.
