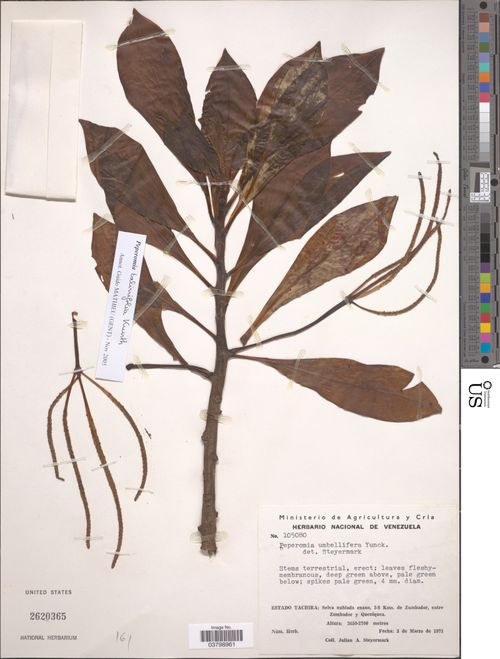

Scientific classification
- Kingdom: Plantae
- Clade: Embryophytes
- Clade: Tracheophytes
- Clade: Angiosperms
- Clade: Magnoliids
- Order: Piperales
- Family: Piperaceae
- Genus: Peperomia
- Species: P. talinifolia

Binomial name
- Peperomia talinifolia Kunth

Synonyms
- Piper talinifolium (Kunth) Poir.; Peperomia talinifolia var. longipetiolata C.DC.; Peperomia umbellifera Yunck.

= Peperomia talinifolia =

Species of flowering plant

Peperomia talinifolia is a species of hemiepiphytic subshrub in the genus Peperomia. It was first described by Carl Sigismund Kunth and published in the book "Nova Genera et Species Plantarum (quarto ed.) 1: 62, t. 8. 1815[1816]. (29 Jan 1816)". It primarily grows on subtropical biome.

== Distribution ==
It is endemic to Central, South America and Jamaica. First specimens where found at an altitude of 1700 hexap in Quindío.

- Bolivia
  - Chuquisaca
  - La Paz
    - Franz Tamayo
    - Pedro Domingo Murillo
    - Larecaja
    - Nor Yungas
  - Tarija
  - Cochabamba
- Brazil
  - Rio de Janeiro
- Costa Rica
  - Limón
  - Cartago
  - Puntarenas
- Colombia
  - Nariño
  - Cundinamarca
  - Huila
  - Quindío
  - Tolima
- Ecuador
  - Chimborazo
  - Imbabura
  - Morona Santiago
- Jamaica
- Panama
  - Bocas del Toro
- Peru
  - San Martín
  - Amazonas
- Venezuela
  - Táchira
  - Mérida
  - Trujillo

== Description ==
The stem is upright, branching, and features oblong leaves that are bluntly sub-cuneate at the base, fleshy-subcoriaceous, darkly veined, and hairless. The axillary peduncles are bractate or tripolicar.

The stem is smooth, fleshy, erect, simple or branching, and half a foot long. Its thickness is comparable to that of a swan's feather. The leaves are glabrous, fleshy-subcoriaceous, alternating, quadripollicaria, approximate, oblong, narrowed on both sides, obtuse, and sub-cuneate at the base. Petioles are glabrous, three lines long, dilated. Axillary is, biad, tripollicar, pentastachy, or tripollicar pedicles. Spades are pedicellate, cylindracci, hesquipedal to three pollicare, and the thickness of a crow's feather. Two or three tiny bracts around the base of the spadix that resemble leaves. Four to eleven line pedicels are used. It has dense blossoms.
