= Sauce District =

Coordinates: 6.6898°S 76.2171°W

Sauce Sawsi
- District
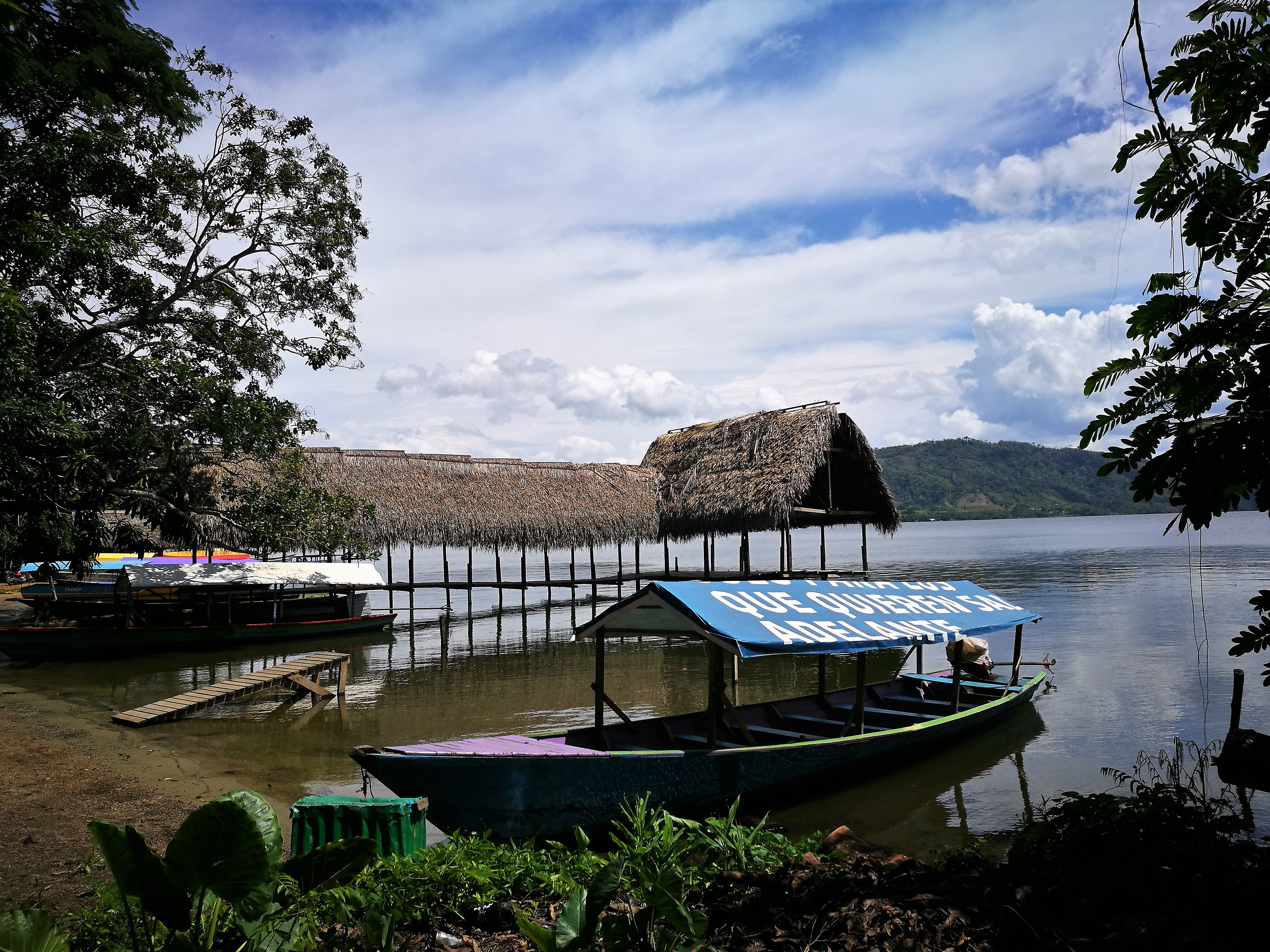
- Sawsiqucha
- Interactive map of Sauce; Sawsi
- Country: Peru
- Region: San Martín
- Province: San Martín
- Founded: May 20, 1936
- Capital: Sauce

Government
  - Mayor: Sebastian Calderon Bacon

Area
  - Total: 103 km^{2} (40 sq mi)
- Elevation: 600 m (2,000 ft)

Population (2005 census)
  - Total: 5,350
  - Density: 51.9/km^{2} (135/sq mi)
- Time zone: UTC-5 (PET)
- UBIGEO: 220913

Sauce (hispanicized spelling of Quechua sawsi willow) is one of fourteen districts of the province San Martín in Peru.

== Geography ==
Located in the foothills of the Cordillera Oriental (Peru), the town is 614 m a.s.l. and 51 km south of the Tarapoto city, across the Huallaga River, 6°42’12” south latitude and 76°15’15” west longitude.

== Places of interest ==
- Sawsiqucha

== Climate ==
Climate data for Sauce, elevation 614 m (2,014 ft), (1991–2020)
Month	Jan	Feb	Mar	Apr	May	Jun	Jul	Aug	Sep	Oct	Nov	Dec	Year
Mean daily maximum °C (°F)	30.0 (86.0)	29.5 (85.1)	29.1 (84.4)	28.7 (83.7)	28.8 (83.8)	28.5 (83.3)	28.5 (83.3)	29.2 (84.6)	29.6 (85.3)	29.8 (85.6)	30.2 (86.4)	30.2 (86.4)	29.3 (84.8)
Mean daily minimum °C (°F)	20.0 (68.0)	19.7 (67.5)	19.5 (67.1)	19.2 (66.6)	19.0 (66.2)	18.1 (64.6)	17.5 (63.5)	17.6 (63.7)	18.5 (65.3)	19.3 (66.7)	19.8 (67.6)	20.1 (68.2)	19.0 (66.3)
Average precipitation mm (inches)	81.1 (3.19)	120.3 (4.74)	159.5 (6.28)	172.8 (6.80)	121.6 (4.79)	99.9 (3.93)	82.4 (3.24)	84.0 (3.31)	113.0 (4.45)	121.4 (4.78)	103.3 (4.07)	93.6 (3.69)	1,352.9 (53.27)
Source: National Meteorology and Hydrology Service of Peru
