= Papaplaya District =

Coordinates: 6.2118°S 75.7949°W

Papaplaya
- District
- Interactive map of Papaplaya
- Country: Peru
- Region: San Martín
- Province: San Martín
- Founded: May 8, 1936
- Capital: Papaplaya

Government
  - Mayor: Orlando Hipushima Chumbe

Area
  - Total: 686.19 km^{2} (264.94 sq mi)
- Elevation: 100 m (330 ft)

Population (2005 census)
  - Total: 2,648
  - Density: 3.859/km^{2} (9.995/sq mi)
- Time zone: UTC-5 (PET)
- UBIGEO: 220911

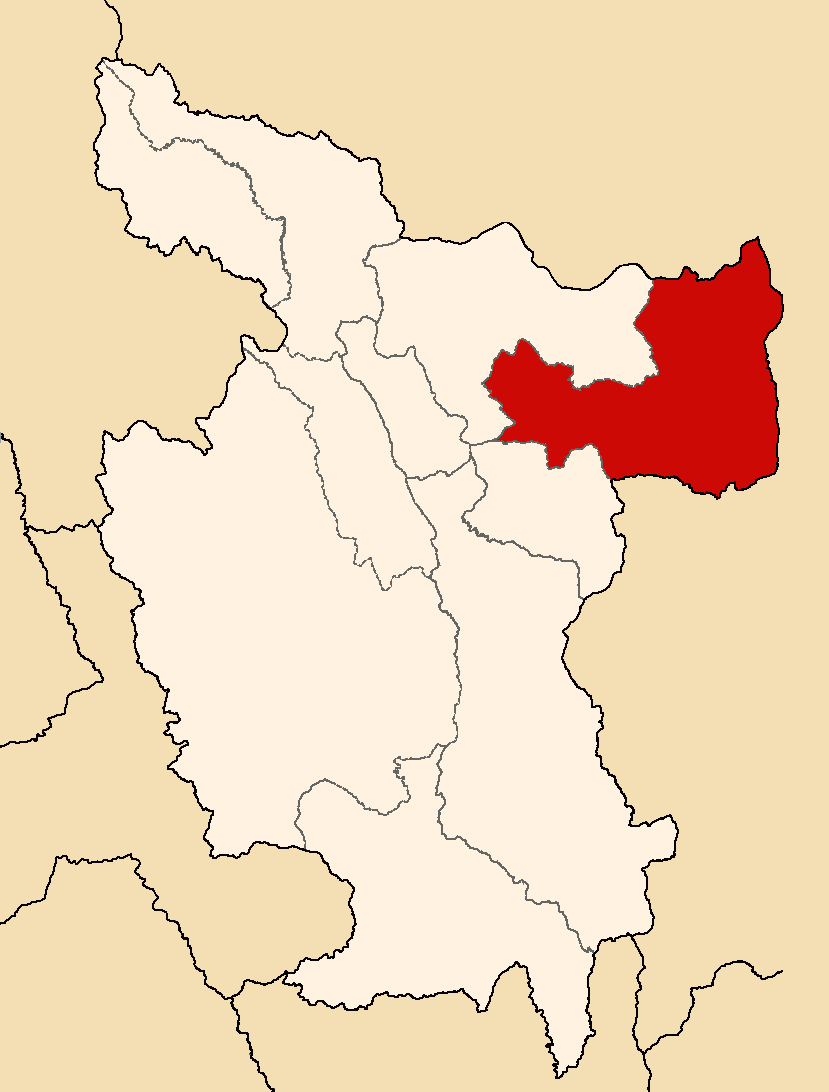
Location of the province San Martín in the San Martín region in Peru (Map)

Papaplaya District is one of fourteen districts of the province San Martín in Peru.
