= San Antonio District, San Martín =

Coordinates: 6.4207°S 76.4068°W

San Antonio District
- District
- Interactive map of San Antonio District
- Country: Peru
- Region: San Martín
- Province: San Martín
- Founded: October 31, 1932
- Capital: San Antonio

Government
  - Mayor: Carmen Isabel Vasquez Pinedo

Area
  - Total: 93.03 km^{2} (35.92 sq mi)
- Elevation: 500 m (1,600 ft)

Population (2005 census)
  - Total: 1,489
  - Density: 16.01/km^{2} (41.45/sq mi)
- Time zone: UTC-5 (PET)
- UBIGEO: 220912

San Antonio District is one of fourteen districts of the province San Martín in Peru.

== Climate ==
Climate data for San Antonio, elevation 467 m (1,532 ft), (1991–2020)
Month	Jan	Feb	Mar	Apr	May	Jun	Jul	Aug	Sep	Oct	Nov	Dec	Year
Mean daily maximum °C (°F)	32.5 (90.5)	31.8 (89.2)	31.4 (88.5)	31.5 (88.7)	31.6 (88.9)	31.5 (88.7)	31.6 (88.9)	32.7 (90.9)	32.9 (91.2)	32.7 (90.9)	32.7 (90.9)	32.5 (90.5)	32.1 (89.8)
Mean daily minimum °C (°F)	20.9 (69.6)	20.5 (68.9)	20.3 (68.5)	20.1 (68.2)	19.8 (67.6)	19.4 (66.9)	18.8 (65.8)	19.2 (66.6)	19.4 (66.9)	20.1 (68.2)	21.0 (69.8)	20.8 (69.4)	20.0 (68.0)
Average precipitation mm (inches)	154.8 (6.09)	179.1 (7.05)	215.6 (8.49)	178.0 (7.01)	148.7 (5.85)	107.8 (4.24)	102.4 (4.03)	75.8 (2.98)	124.1 (4.89)	158.8 (6.25)	137.2 (5.40)	146.8 (5.78)	1,729.1 (68.06)
Source: National Meteorology and Hydrology Service of Peru
