= Chipurana District =

Coordinates: 6.4425°S 75.8051°W

- District
- Interactive map of Chipurana District
- Country: Peru
- Region: San Martín
- Province: San Martín
- Founded: January 31, 1944
- Capital: Navarro

Government
  - Mayor: Cesar Augusto Cavero Napuchi

Area
  - Total: 500.44 km^{2} (193.22 sq mi)
- Elevation: 110 m (360 ft)

Population (2005 census)
  - Total: 1,879
  - Density: 3.755/km^{2} (9.725/sq mi)
- Time zone: UTC-5 (PET)
- UBIGEO: 220905

Chipurana District is one of fourteen districts of the province San Martín in Peru.
