= Alberto Leveau District =

Coordinates: 6.6651°S 76.2957°W

Alberto Leveau
- District
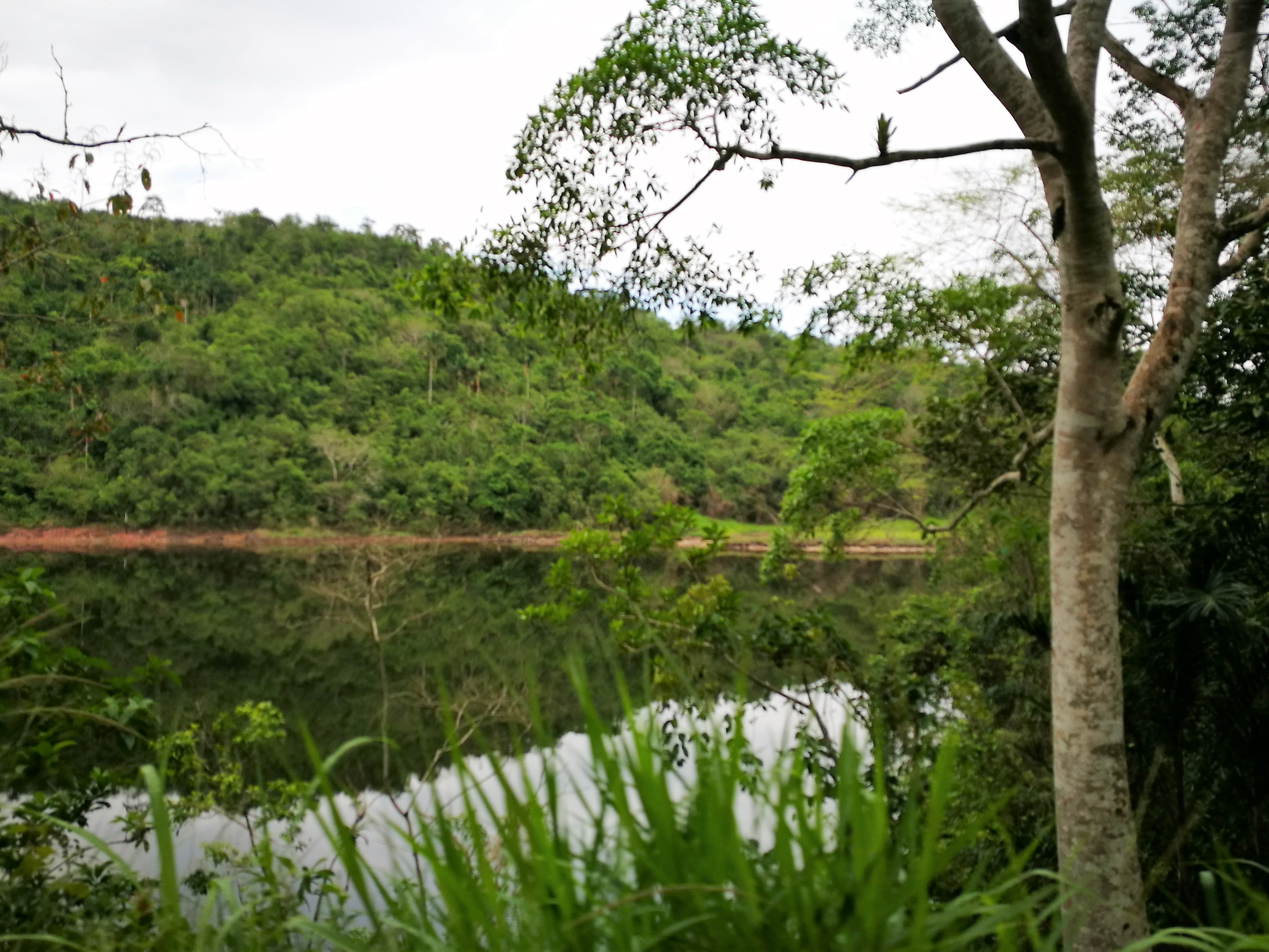
- A lake in the district of Alberto Leveau
- Interactive map of Alberto Leveau
- Country: Peru
- Region: San Martín
- Province: San Martín
- Founded: December 15, 1961
- Capital: Utcurarca

Government
  - Mayor: Aniel Gonzales Ushiñahua

Area
  - Total: 268.4 km^{2} (103.6 sq mi)
- Elevation: 190 m (620 ft)

Population (2017)
  - Total: 841
  - Density: 3.13/km^{2} (8.12/sq mi)
- Time zone: UTC-5 (PET)
- UBIGEO: 220902

Alberto Leveau District is one of 14 districts of the San Martín province in Peru.
