= Cacatachi District =

Coordinates: 6.4601°S 76.4518°W

- District
- Interactive map of Cacatachi District
- Country: Peru
- Region: San Martín
- Province: San Martín
- Founded: October 31, 1932
- Capital: Cacatachi

Government
  - Mayor: Edgard Cotrina Vasquez

Area
  - Total: 75.36 km^{2} (29.10 sq mi)
- Elevation: 295 m (968 ft)

Population (2005 census)
  - Total: 2,904
  - Density: 38.54/km^{2} (99.81/sq mi)
- Time zone: UTC-5 (PET)
- UBIGEO: 220903

Cacatachi District is one of fourteen districts of the province San Martín in Peru.
