= La Banda de Shilcayo District =

Coordinates: 6.4962°S 76.3631°W

La Banda de Shilcayo
- District
- Coat of arms
- Interactive map of La Banda de Shilcayo
- Country: Peru
- Region: San Martín
- Province: San Martín
- Founded: November 28, 1961
- Capital: La Banda

Government
  - Mayor: Alberto Enrique Hildebrandt Pinedo (2022- )

Area
  - Total: 286.68 km^{2} (110.69 sq mi)
- Elevation: 350 m (1,150 ft)

Population (2017)
  - Total: 43,481
  - Density: 151.67/km^{2} (392.83/sq mi)
- Time zone: UTC-5 (PET)
- UBIGEO: 220909

La Banda de Shilcayo District is one of fourteen districts of the province San Martín in Peru.
