= Shapaja District =

Coordinates: 6.5791°S 76.2659°W

Shapaja
- District
- Interactive map of Shapaja
- Country: Peru
- Region: San Martín
- Province: San Martín
- Founded: August 14, 1920
- Capital: Shapaja

Government
  - Mayor: Luis Alberto Delgado Babilonia

Area
  - Total: 270.44 km^{2} (104.42 sq mi)
- Elevation: 207 m (679 ft)

Population (2005 census)
  - Total: 1,799
  - Density: 6.652/km^{2} (17.23/sq mi)
- Time zone: UTC-5 (PET)
- UBIGEO: 220914

Shapaja District is one of fourteen districts of the province San Martín in Peru. The name comes from Shapaja palm tree that is local to the region. The district is known for its beaches and fisheries which employ many of the locals.
