= San Martín province =

Coordinates: 6°29′20″S 76°21′43″W

San Martín
- Province
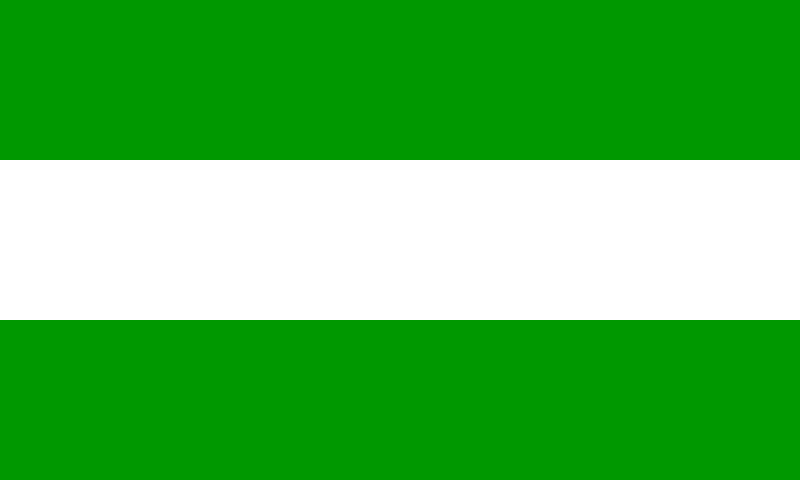
- Flag

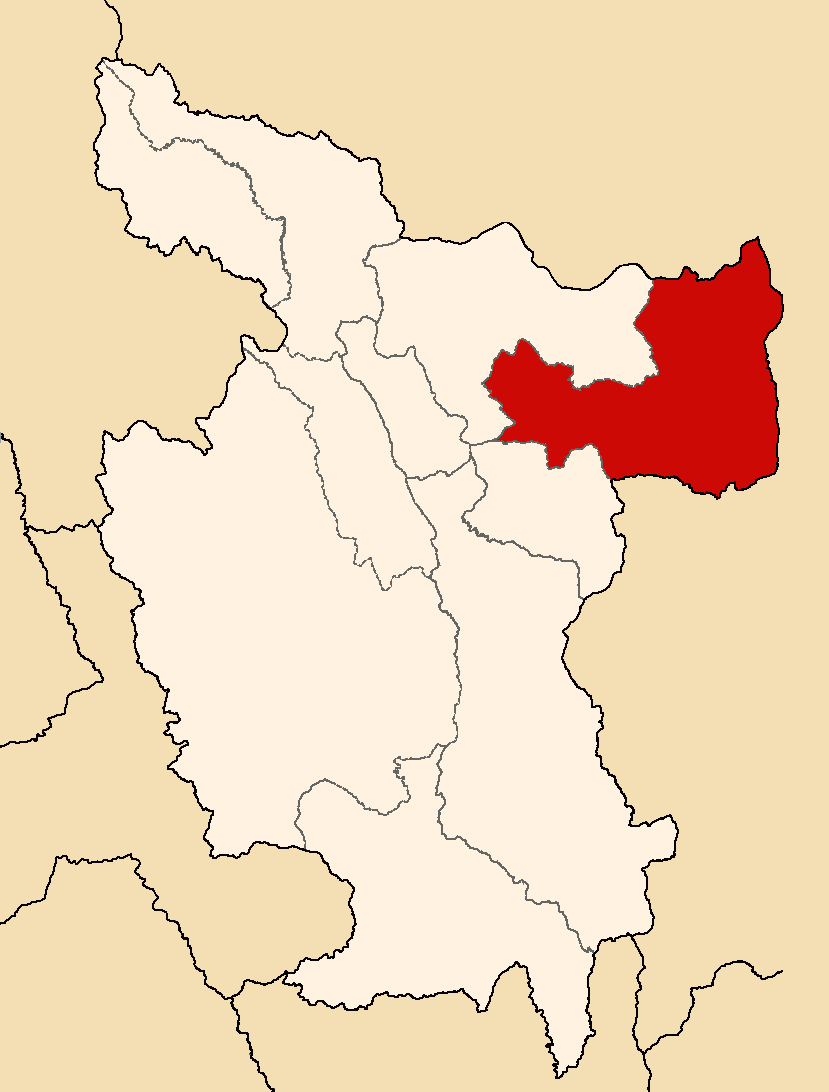
- Location of San Martín in the San Martín Region
- Country: Peru
- Region: San Martín
- Capital: Tarapoto

Government
  - Mayor: Tedy Del Águila Gronerth (2019–2022)

Area
  - Total: 5,639.82 km^{2} (2,177.55 sq mi)

Population
  - Total: 193,095
  - Density: 34.2378/km^{2} (88.6755/sq mi)
- UBIGEO: 2209

San Martín is a provinces of the San Martín Region in northern Peru.

== Political division ==
The province is divided into fourteen districts, which are:

- Alberto Leveau (Utcurarca)
- Cacatachi (Cacatachi)
- Chazuta (Chazuta)
- Chipurana (Navarro)
- El Porvenir (Pelejo)
- Huimbayoc (Huimbayoc)
- Juan Guerra (Juan Guerra)
- La Banda de Shilcayo (La Banda)
- Morales (Morales)
- Papaplaya (Papaplaya)
- San Antonio (San Antonio)
- Sauce (Sauce)
- Shapaja (Shapaja)
- Tarapoto (Tarapoto)

== Places of interest ==
- Sawsiqucha

== See also ==
- Administrative divisions of Peru
