= Regional Museum of the National University of San Martin =

Museum

Coordinates: 6.4888°S 76.3593°W

Regional Museum of the National University of San Martín
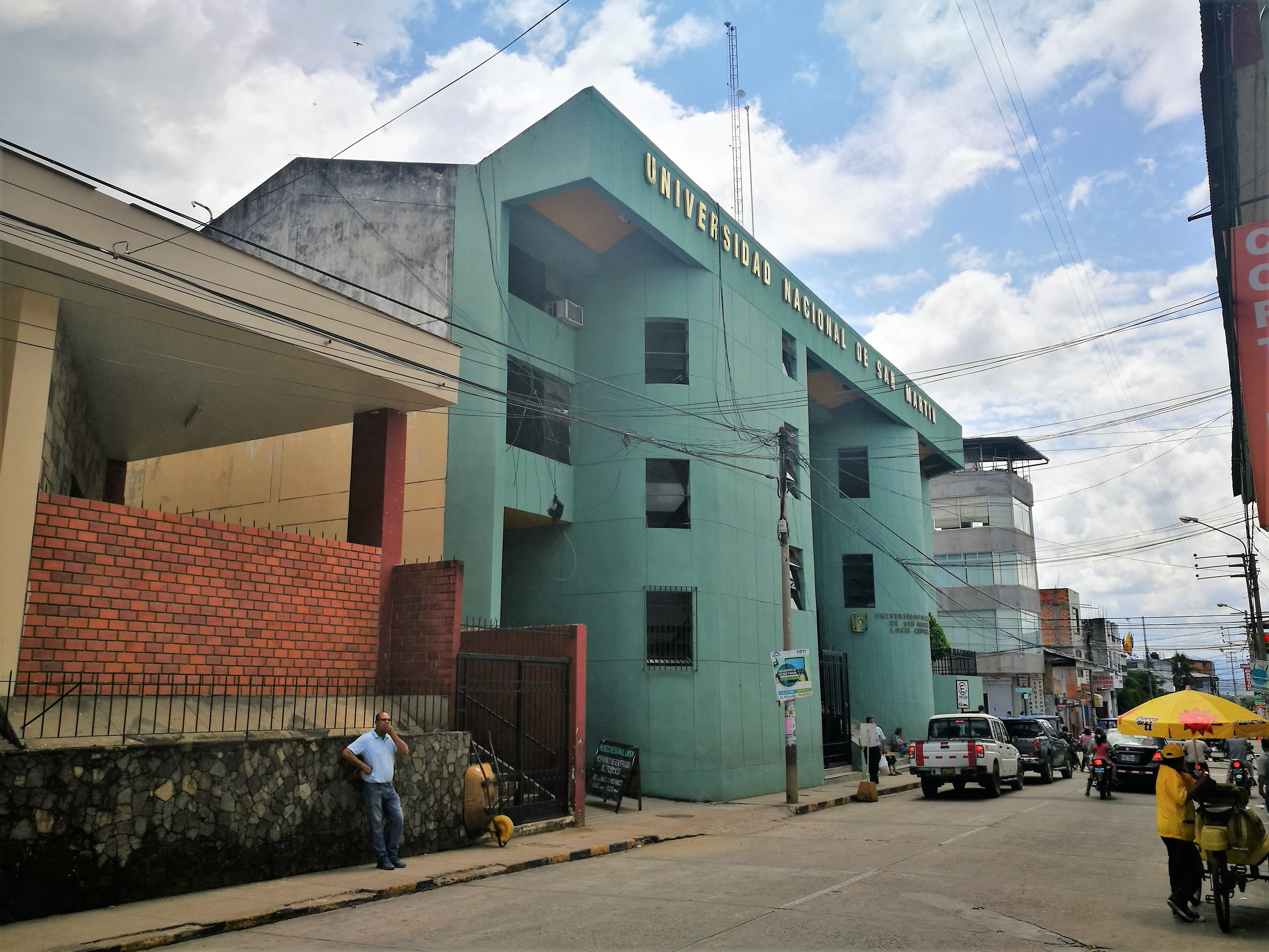
- Location: Tarapoto, Peru

The Regional Museum of the National University of San Martín (Spanish: Museo Regional de la Universidad Nacional de San Martín) in Tarapoto, Peru, holds ethnographic and archaeological collections related to the Peruvian Upper Amazon (selva alta and selva baja). The Museum holds the famous 450-year-old Shimbillo-Chazuta mummy.

== History ==
The UNSM Regional Museum was founded on July 13, 1993 under an initiative led by a group of university professors and the chancellor, Alfredo Quinteros García. In 2011, Bartholomew Dean of the University of Kansas established the Division of Anthropology at the Museo Regional-UNSM. The anthropological research program of the Regional Museum-UNSM reflects the collaborative effort of members of the Department of Anthropology at the University of Kansas and faculty from the Graduate School of the Universidad Nacional de San Martin.

== Collections ==
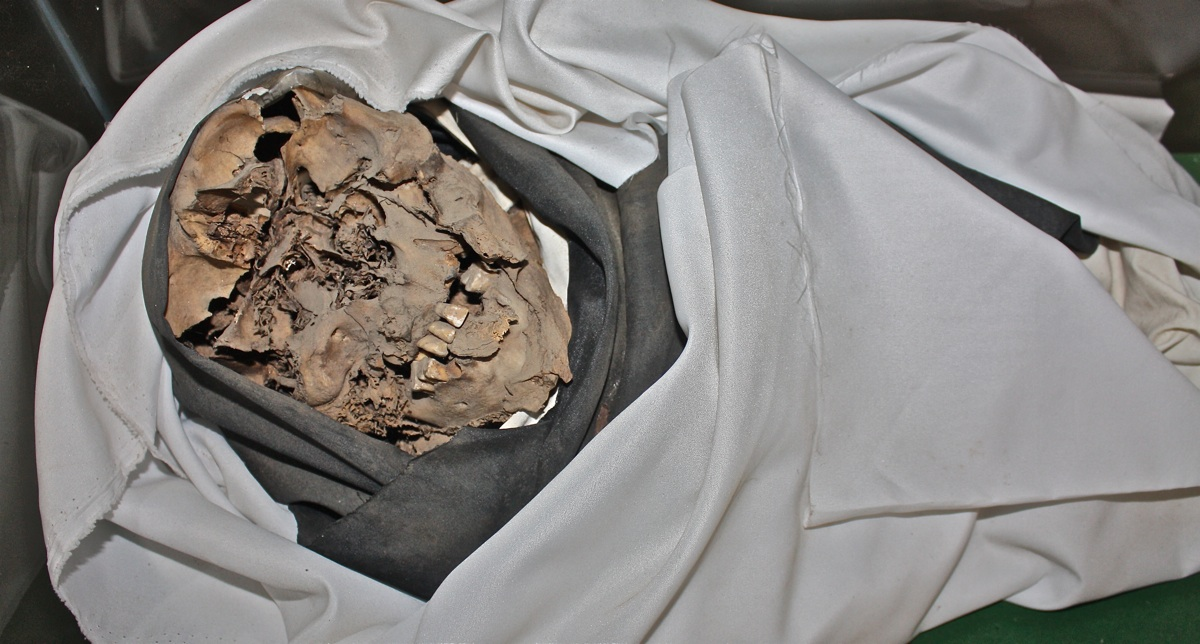
Mummy found near Shimbillo-Chazuta, Peru.

The museum currently houses more than 3,700 artifacts primarily from the Amazonas Region of Peru. This collection includes a replica of the Bello Horizonte Petroglyphs (Petroglifos de Polish), Prehispanic bronze and ceramic ware, numerous contemporary and ancient spindle whorls, a diverse collection of ethnographic objects from the "Chacarero" collection, and the famous 450-year-old "Mummy of Shimbillo".

The Mummy of Shimbillo's modern blanket and sacred new clothing were made by a women's association of organic cotton weavers from the town of San Antonio del Rio Mayo, in Lamas Province. In December 2011, Warmi Awakuku in collaboration with the Anthropology Division (Museo Regional-UNSM/University of Kansas) ceremoniously re-wrapped the "Mummy of Shimbillo" in ornate woven cotton clothing (cushma), including a hood .

== See also ==
- Universidad Nacional de San Martín
