= El Porvenir District, San Martín =

Coordinates: 6.2135°S 75.8038°W

El Porvenir District
- District
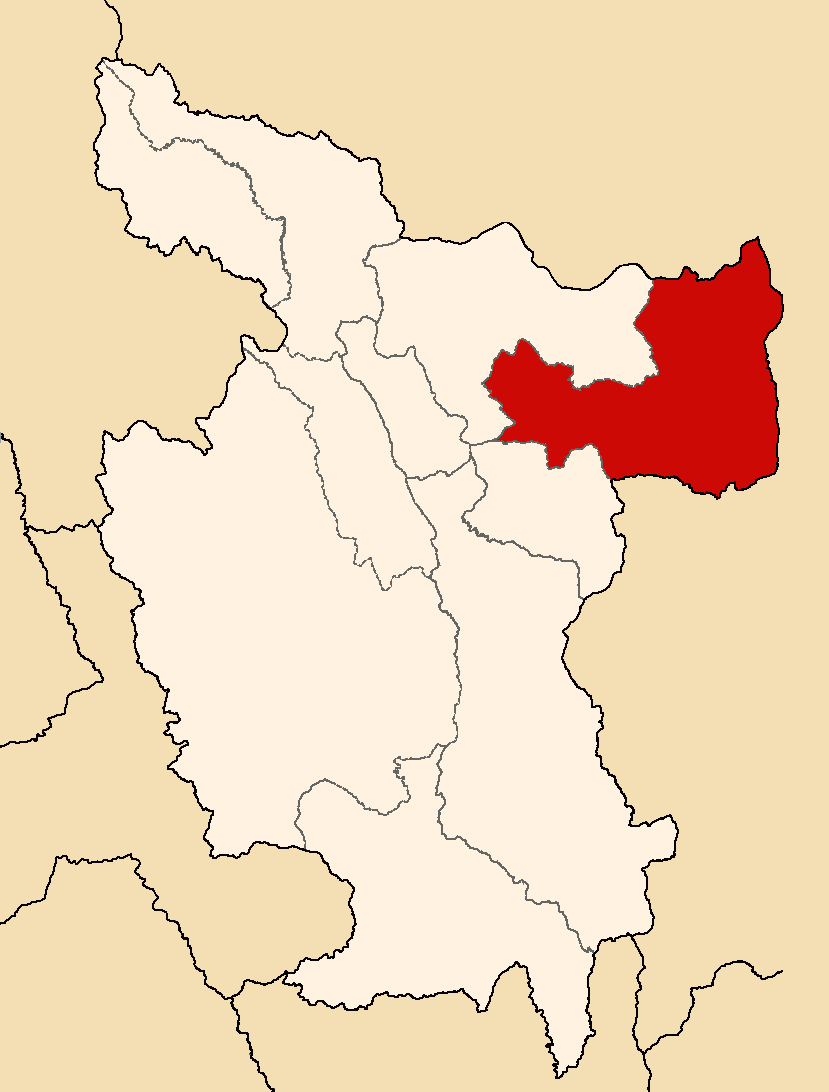
- El Porvenir District in Map
- Interactive map of El Porvenir District
- Country: Peru
- Region: San Martín
- Province: San Martín
- Founded: June 18, 1962
- Capital: Pelejo

Government
  - Mayor: Herman Adolfo Jauregui Tejada

Area
  - Total: 472.61 km^{2} (182.48 sq mi)
- Elevation: 110 m (360 ft)

Population (2005 census)
  - Total: 1,614
  - Density: 3.415/km^{2} (8.845/sq mi)
- Time zone: UTC-5 (PET)
- UBIGEO: 220906

El Porvenir District is one of fourteen districts of the province San Martín in Peru.
