= Juan Guerra District =

Coordinates: 6.5824°S 76.3379°W

Juan Guerra
- District
- Interactive map of Juan Guerra
- Country: Peru
- Region: San Martín
- Province: San Martín
- Founded: October 31, 1932
- Capital: Juan Guerra

Government
  - Mayor: Victor Flores Paredes

Area
  - Total: 196.5 km^{2} (75.9 sq mi)
- Elevation: 200 m (660 ft)

Population (2005 census)
  - Total: 3,286
  - Density: 16.72/km^{2} (43.31/sq mi)
- Time zone: UTC-5 (PET)
- UBIGEO: 220908

Juan Guerra District is one of fourteen districts of the province San Martín in Peru.
