= Morales District =

Coordinates: 6.4792°S 76.4026°W

Morales
- District
- Interactive map of Morales
- Country: Peru
- Region: San Martín
- Province: San Martín
- Founded: October 31, 1932
- Capital: Morales

Government
  - Mayor: Linder Arevalo Melendez

Area
  - Total: 43.91 km^{2} (16.95 sq mi)
- Elevation: 283 m (928 ft)

Population (2005 census)
  - Total: 21,657
  - Density: 493.2/km^{2} (1,277/sq mi)
- Time zone: UTC-5 (PET)
- UBIGEO: 220910

Morales District is one of fourteen districts of the province San Martín in Peru.
