= Tarapoto District =

Coordinates: 6.4968°S 76.3981°W

Tarapoto
- District
- Interactive map of Tarapoto
- Country: Peru
- Region: San Martín
- Province: San Martín
- Capital: Tarapoto

Government
  - Mayor: Tedy Del Águila Gronerth (2019-2022)

Area
  - Total: 67.81 km^{2} (26.18 sq mi)
- Elevation: 333 m (1,093 ft)

Population (2017)
  - Total: 76,122
  - Density: 1,123/km^{2} (2,907/sq mi)
- Time zone: UTC-5 (PET)
- UBIGEO: 220901

Tarapoto District is one of fourteen districts of the province San Martín in Peru.

== Climate ==
Climate data for Tarapoto, elevation 382 m (1,253 ft), (1991–2020 normals, extremes 1950–present)
Month	Jan	Feb	Mar	Apr	May	Jun	Jul	Aug	Sep	Oct	Nov	Dec	Year
Record high °C (°F)	38.6 (101.5)	40.0 (104.0)	38.8 (101.8)	38.0 (100.4)	38.0 (100.4)	36.1 (97.0)	36.0 (96.8)	37.8 (100.0)	39.0 (102.2)	38.5 (101.3)	38.3 (100.9)	38.0 (100.4)	40.0 (104.0)
Mean daily maximum °C (°F)	32.7 (90.9)	32.2 (90.0)	31.8 (89.2)	31.5 (88.7)	31.4 (88.5)	31.0 (87.8)	31.3 (88.3)	32.9 (91.2)	33.3 (91.9)	33.4 (92.1)	33.3 (91.9)	32.8 (91.0)	32.3 (90.1)
Mean daily minimum °C (°F)	22.3 (72.1)	22.1 (71.8)	21.9 (71.4)	21.6 (70.9)	21.4 (70.5)	20.8 (69.4)	20.1 (68.2)	20.4 (68.7)	21.0 (69.8)	21.8 (71.2)	22.3 (72.1)	22.4 (72.3)	21.5 (70.7)
Record low °C (°F)	15.0 (59.0)	15.6 (60.1)	17.2 (63.0)	15.0 (59.0)	12.0 (53.6)	10.3 (50.5)	12.0 (53.6)	12.2 (54.0)	15.0 (59.0)	13.9 (57.0)	13.9 (57.0)	15.0 (59.0)	10.3 (50.5)
Average precipitation mm (inches)	136.2 (5.36)	147.5 (5.81)	163.0 (6.42)	160.2 (6.31)	109.3 (4.30)	80.0 (3.15)	68.7 (2.70)	55.7 (2.19)	88.5 (3.48)	112.8 (4.44)	131.2 (5.17)	124.5 (4.90)	1,377.6 (54.23)
Source 1: National Meteorology and Hydrology Service of Peru
Source 2: Meteo Climat (record highs and lows)

== See also ==
- Administrative divisions of Peru
