= Sauce, Corrientes =

Sauce Sáuse
- Town
- Location of Sauce in Argentina
- Coordinates: 30°04′S 58°46′W
- Country: Argentina
- Province: Corrientes
- Department: Sauce
- Elevation: 36 m (118 ft)

Population
  - Total: 9,115
- Demonym: Sauceño
- Time zone: UTC−3 (ART)
- CPA base: W3463
- Dialing code: +54 3774

Sauce (Guarani: Sáuse) is a town in Corrientes Province, Argentina. It is the capital of Sauce Department. It is separated from Entre Ríos Province by the Guayquiraró River.

== See also ==
- Sauce (disambiguation)
