= Huimbayoc District =

Coordinates: 6.4190°S 75.7710°W

Huimbayoc Wimpayuq
- District
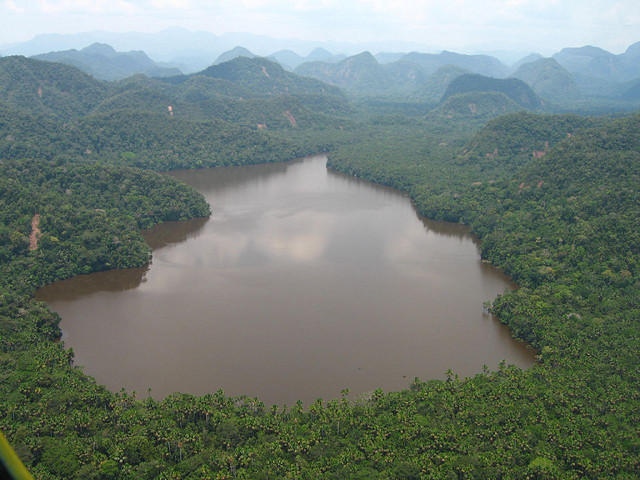
- Laguna del Mundo Perdido, Huimbayoc District, Cordillera Azul National Park
- Interactive map of Huimbayoc
- Country: Peru
- Region: San Martín
- Province: San Martín
- Founded: December 30, 1953
- Capital: Huimbayoc

Government
  - Mayor: Lucas Reynaldo Arevalo Cumapa

Area
  - Total: 1,609.07 km^{2} (621.27 sq mi)
- Elevation: 120 m (390 ft)

Population (2005 census)
  - Total: 4,539
  - Density: 2.821/km^{2} (7.306/sq mi)
- Time zone: UTC-5 (PET)
- UBIGEO: 220907

Huimbayoc or Wimpayuq (Quechua) is one of fourteen districts of the province San Martín in Peru.

Part of the district is located in the Cordillera Azul National Park.

== Climate ==
Climate data for Navarro, Huimbayoc, elevation 148 m (486 ft), (1991–2020)
Month	Jan	Feb	Mar	Apr	May	Jun	Jul	Aug	Sep	Oct	Nov	Dec	Year
Mean daily maximum °C (°F)	31.6 (88.9)	31.5 (88.7)	31.2 (88.2)	31.5 (88.7)	31.7 (89.1)	31.4 (88.5)	31.9 (89.4)	32.1 (89.8)	32.5 (90.5)	32.3 (90.1)	32.0 (89.6)	31.6 (88.9)	31.8 (89.2)
Mean daily minimum °C (°F)	21.7 (71.1)	21.5 (70.7)	21.5 (70.7)	21.4 (70.5)	21.2 (70.2)	20.5 (68.9)	20.0 (68.0)	20.2 (68.4)	20.9 (69.6)	21.5 (70.7)	21.7 (71.1)	21.7 (71.1)	21.2 (70.1)
Average precipitation mm (inches)	171.7 (6.76)	211.9 (8.34)	225.2 (8.87)	191.6 (7.54)	127.2 (5.01)	93.3 (3.67)	75.3 (2.96)	72.2 (2.84)	133.0 (5.24)	158.9 (6.26)	193.6 (7.62)	208.1 (8.19)	1,862 (73.3)
Source: National Meteorology and Hydrology Service of Peru
