= Sauce Department =

Sauce Department Departamento Sauce (Spanish) Tetãvore Sáuse (Guarani)
- Department
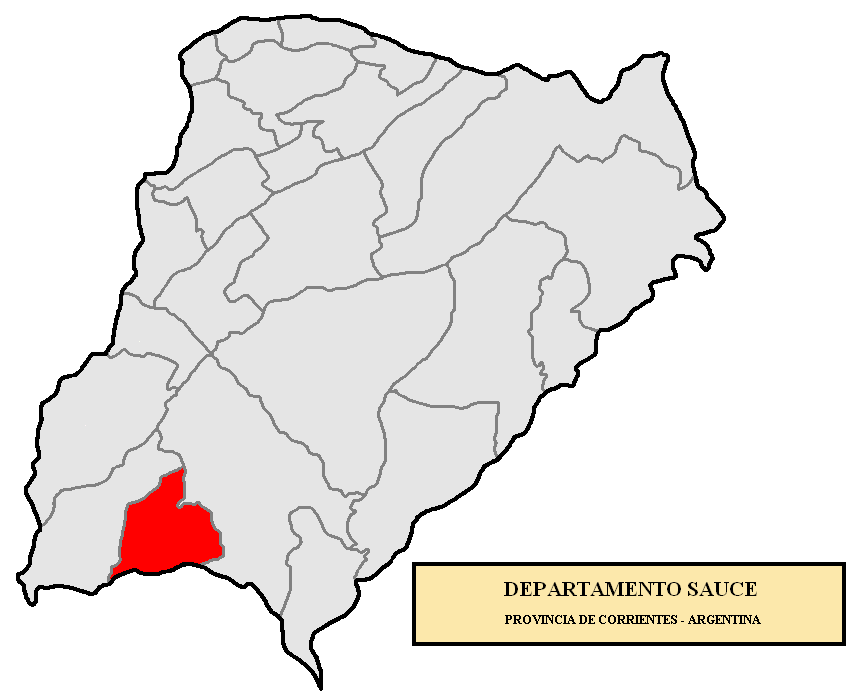
- location of Sauce Department in Corrientes Province
- Coordinates: 30°04′S 58°46′W
- Country: Argentina
- Seat: Sauce

Area
  - Total: 1,760 km^{2} (680 sq mi)

Population (2001 census [INDEC])
  - Total: 9,151
  - Density: 5.20/km^{2} (13.5/sq mi)
- Demonym: Sauceño
- Postal Code: W3463
- Area Code: 03774
- Website: www.sauce.gov.ar

Sauce Department is a department of Corrientes Province in Argentina.

The provincial subdivision has a population of about 9,151 inhabitants in an area of 795 km^{2} (307 sq mi), and its capital city is Sauce, which is located around 795 km (494 mi) from Capital Federal.
