= Lake Sauce =

Lake in Peru

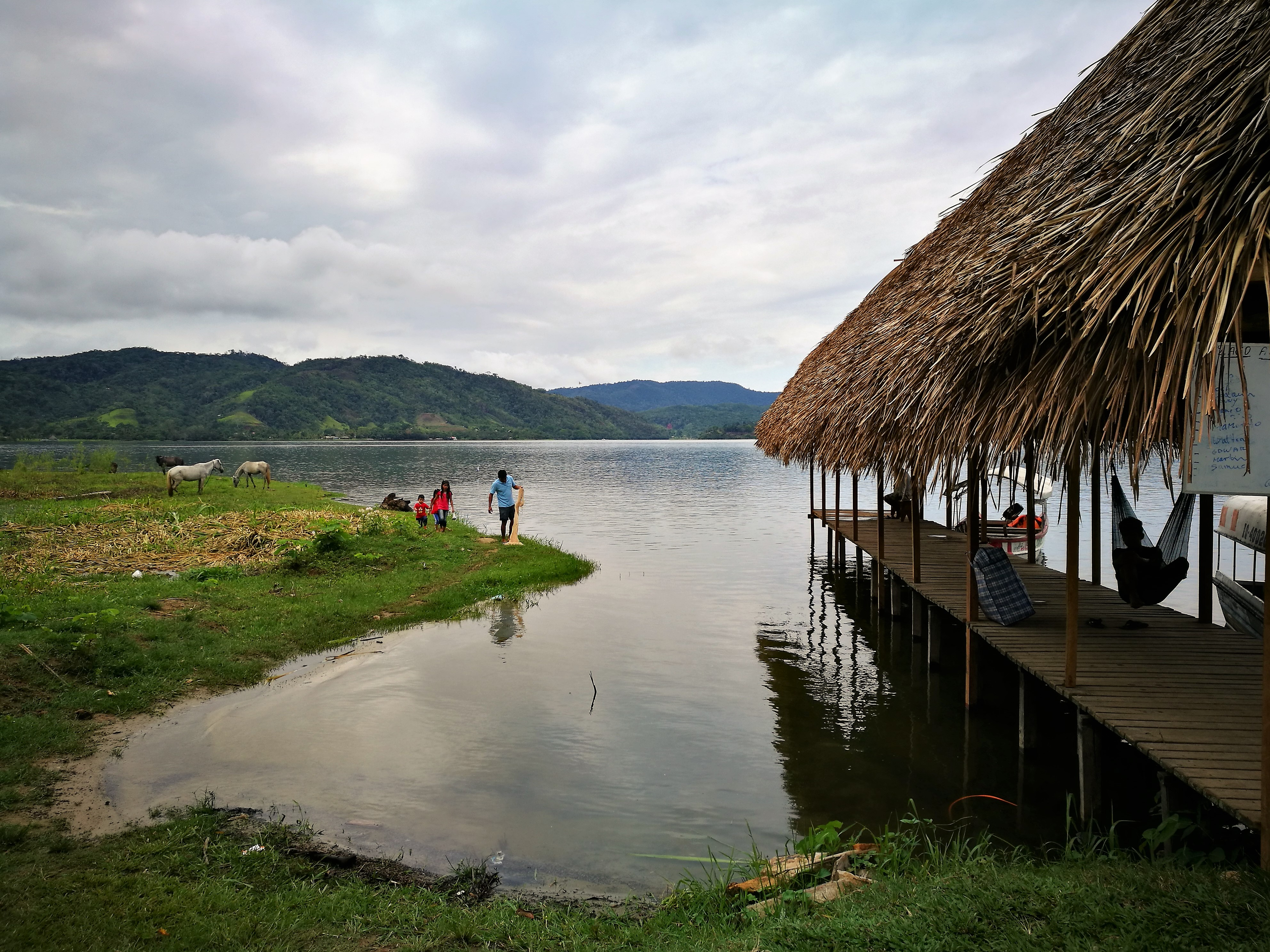

- Location within Peru
- Location: Sauce, San Martin, Peru
- Coordinates: 6.710237°S 76.219711°W
- Basin countries: Peru
- Surface area: 4.3 km^{2} (1.7 sq mi)
- Average depth: 37.5 m (123 ft)
- Water volume: 79,806 m^{3} (2,818,300 cu ft)
- Surface elevation: 700 m (2,300 ft)

Lake Sauce also locally known as Laguna Azul (Spanish for "blue lake"), is a lake in Peru. It is located in the region of San Martin, 45 km from the city of Tarapoto, at 700 m of elevation and has an area of 4.3 km^{2}. The lake is surrounded by hotels, camping facilities, forest remnants and agricultural land. The lake is a good spot for swimming and fishing.
