= Tarapoto =

City in Peru

Tarapoto Santa Cruz de los Motilones de Tarapoto
- Town
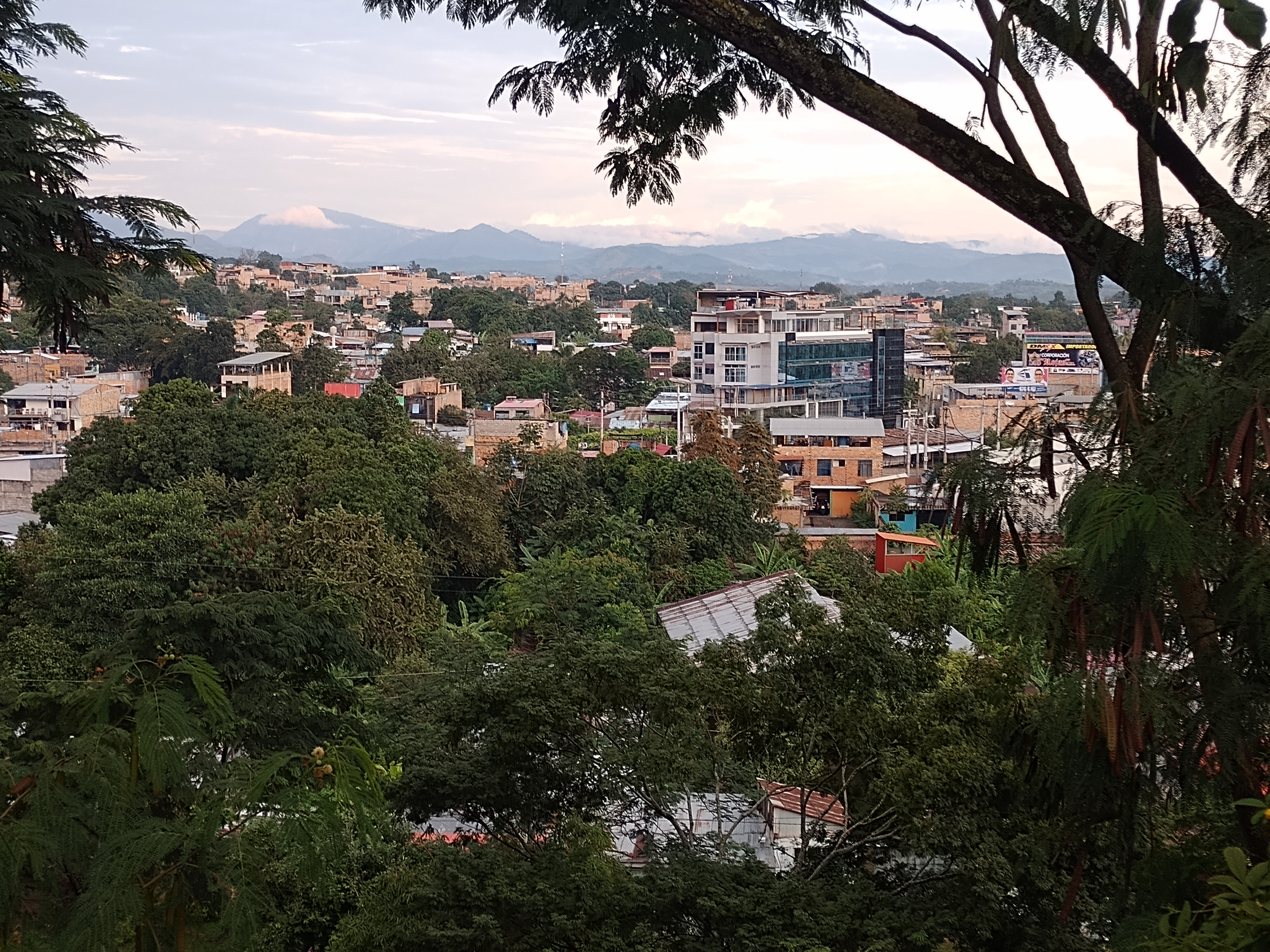
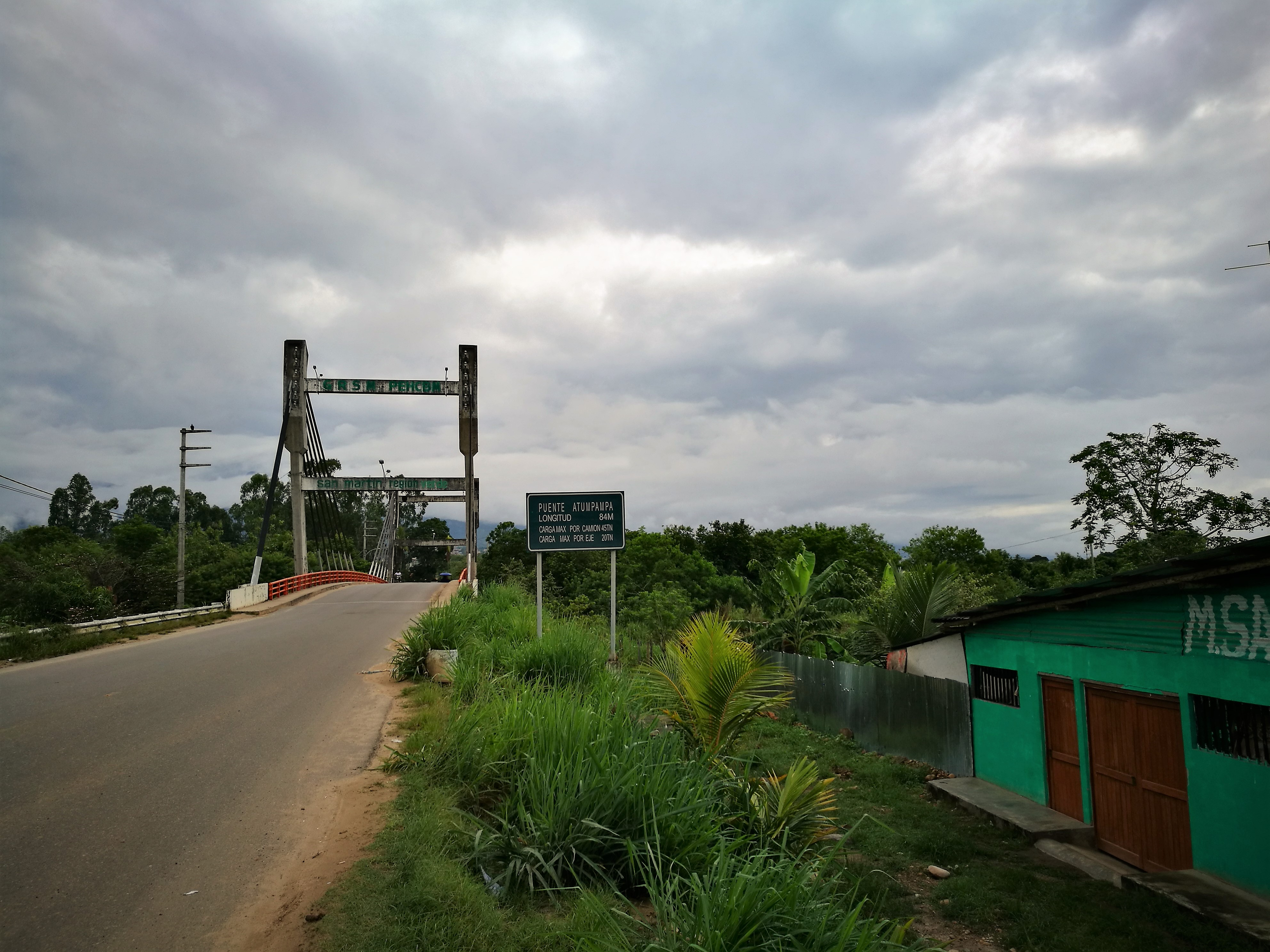
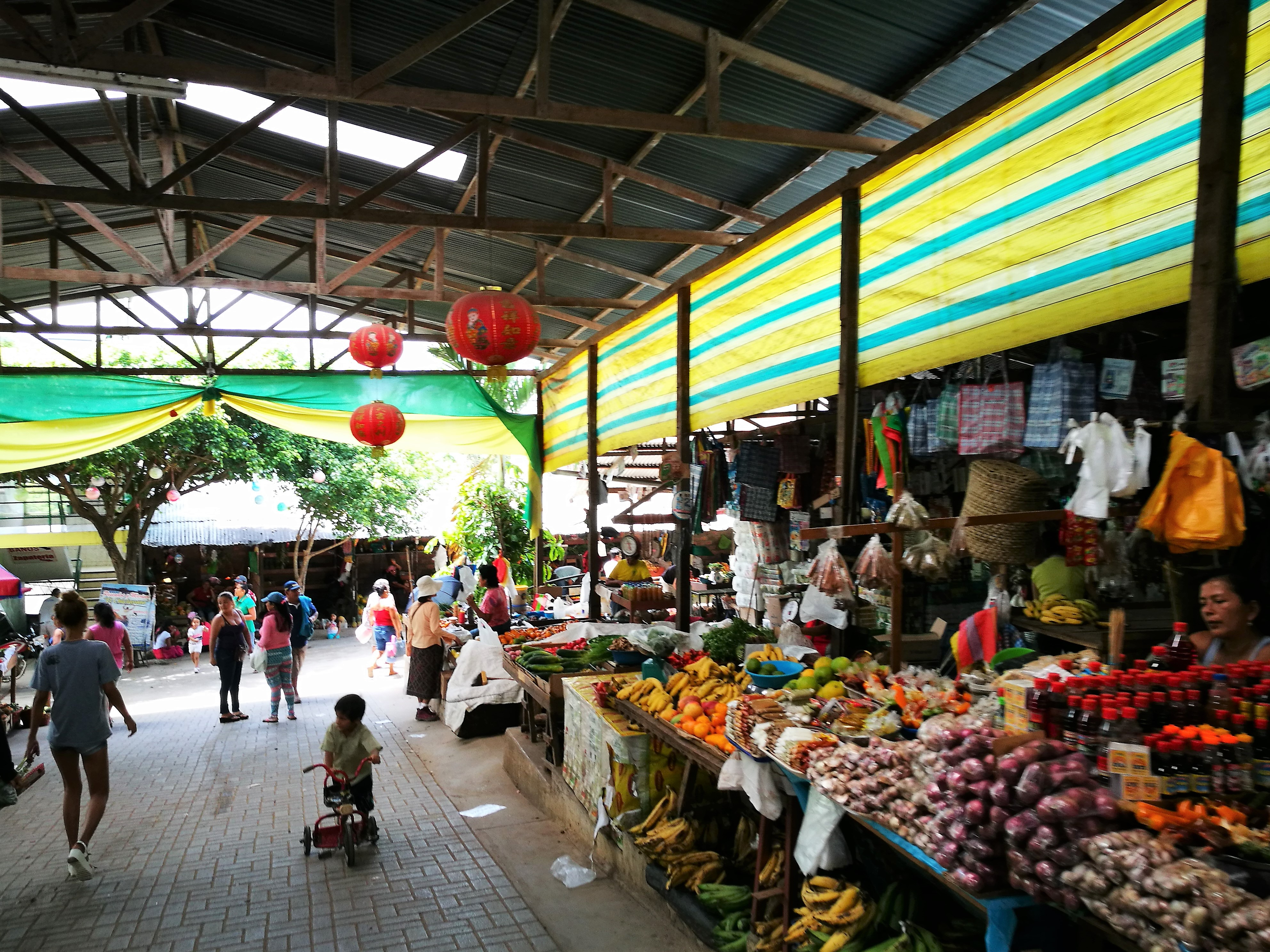
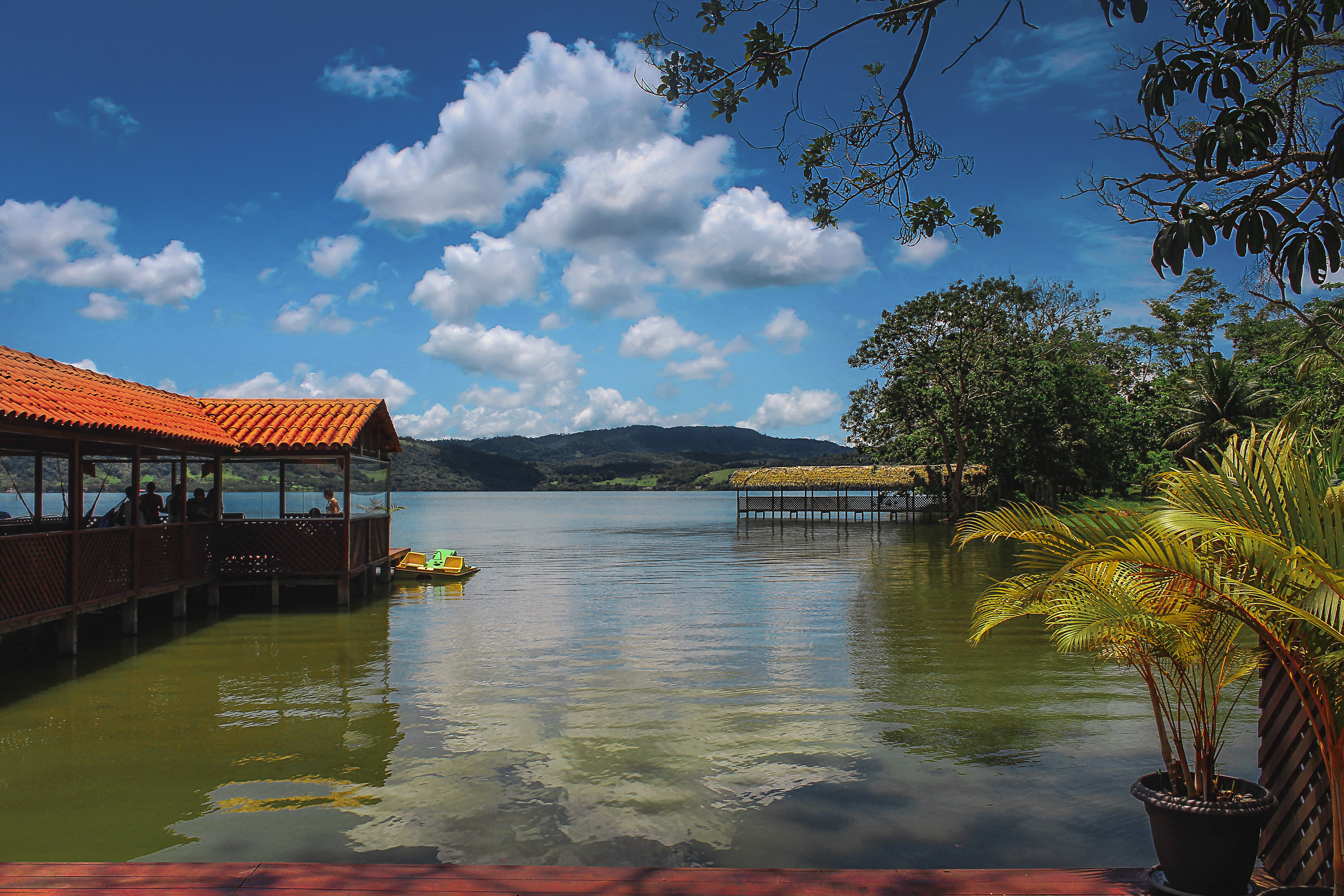
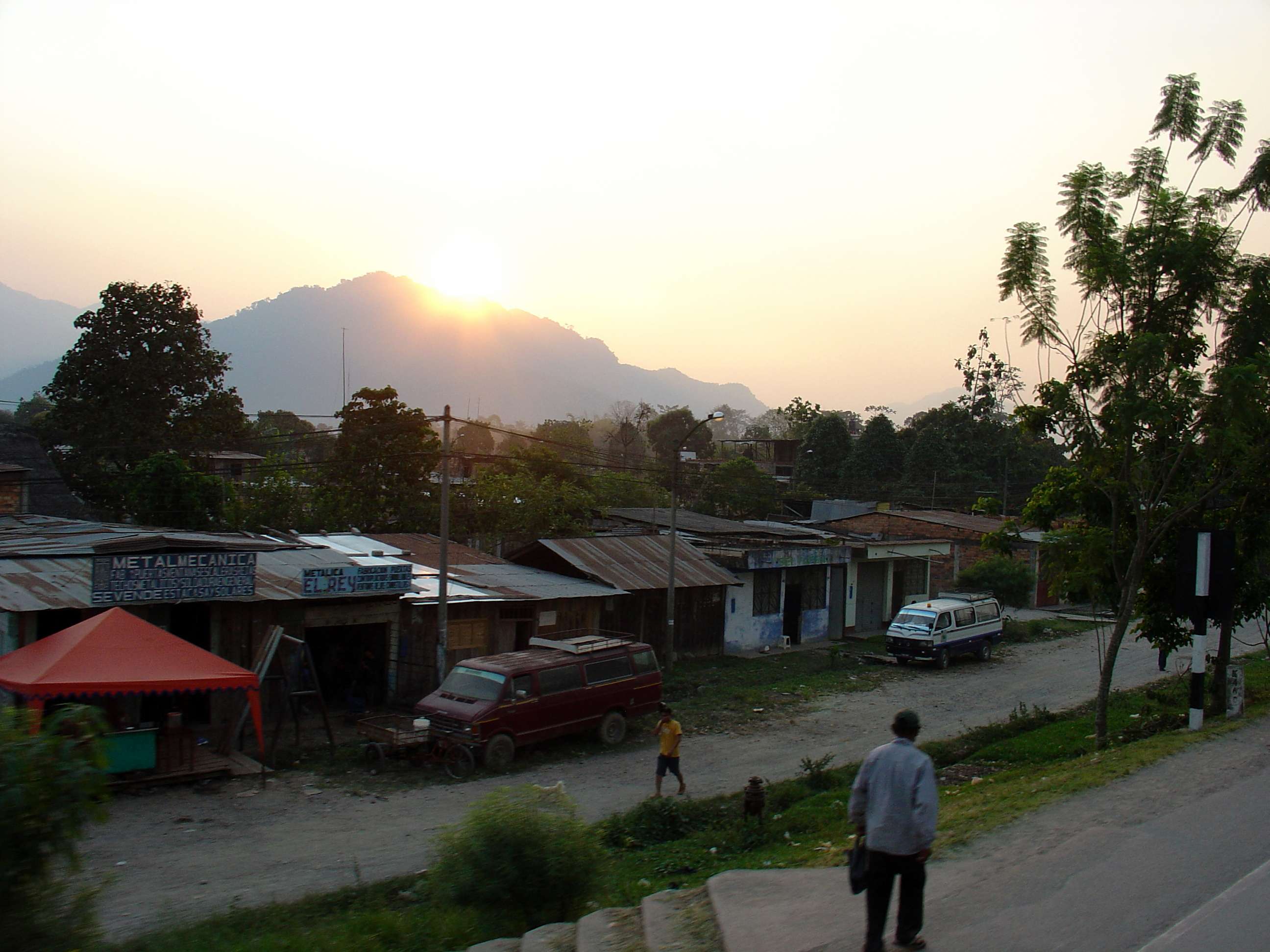
- A collage of some places in Tarapoto

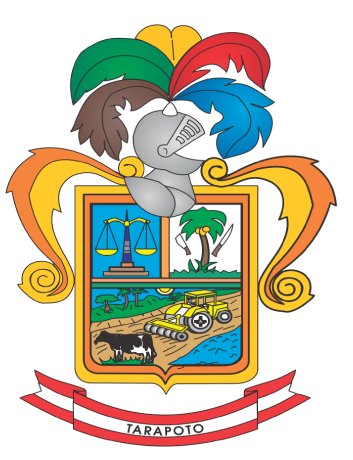
- Flag Seal
- Nickname: City of Palms
- Location within Peru
- Coordinates: 6°29′S 76°22′W
- Country: Peru
- Region: San Martín
- Province: San Martín
- District: Tarapoto
- Founded: 20 August 1782

Government
  - Mayor: Henry Maldonado Flores (2019-2022)

Area
  - Total: 60.8 km^{2} (23.5 sq mi)
- Elevation: 356 m (1,168 ft)

Population (2022)
  - Total: 223,186
  - Density: 3,670/km^{2} (9,510/sq mi)
- Demonyms: Tarapotino (a)

Tarapoto, founded in 1782 as Santa Cruz de los Motilones de Tarapoto, is a commercial hub town in the San Martín Province of the Department of San Martín of northern Peru. It is an hour by plane from Lima, in the high jungle plateau to the east of what is known as the selva baja (low jungle). Although Moyobamba is the capital of the region, Tarapoto is the region's largest city and is linked to the Upper Amazon and the historic city of Yurimaguas by a relatively well-maintained transandean highway, paved in 2008–9.

Tarapoto is approximately 356 metres (1,168 ft) above sea level on the high jungle plateau, also called the cloud forest. It was founded in 1782 by Baltasar Jaime Martínez Compañón. According to the 2017 census Tarapoto has a population of 180,073 within the city limits, and over 200,000 inhabitants including the outlying Morales and Banda de Shilcayo districts, which makes it the most populated city in the department and the third largest and most populated Amazonian city after Pucallpa and Iquitos, Tarapoto is older than these cities, in addition to having better services, paved roads, luxury hotels and comforts in the heart of the Amazon.

Tarapoto is often used by tourists and local visitors as a base for excursions into the vast Amazon rainforest. The region's main activities are tourism, commerce, agriculture, and an illicit "shadow economy" that includes production of coca leaves, lately in decline, extraction of lumber, and trading in land concessions.

Tarapoto is home to the Universidad Nacional de San Martín, an important center of higher education serving the professional and technical needs of a region of high biodiversity. With its active nightlife, Tarapoto offers a wide variety of hotels and restaurants in and around the city. Moreover, the area's beautiful landscapes, waterfalls and lagoons make it a good place for adventure tourism, such as river rafting and hiking in the tropical Andes, and attract numerous visitors to the "City of Palms".

Tarapoto concentrates a large part of the tourist and commercial activity in the region, being the third most sought after and visited city by Peruvians after Lima and Cusco; it is surrounded to the north by the regional conservation area of the Cordillera Escalera within the South American tropical rainforest and to the south by a fertile valley with crops of rice, corn, coffee, cocoa, tobacco and various agricultural products, with seasonally dry forests.

The city is a key center of agricultural products, the surroundings concentrate a wide endemic biodiversity, originating from the last foothills of the eastern Andes, these give rise to an enormous botanical and biological wealth, of an incredible variety of amphibian and bird species. ideal for birdwatching, in addition to a large number of waterfalls, this gave rise to the growth of ecotourism, mainly since the mid-1990s.

Currently, the Amazonian metropolis has several hypermarket chains, with all kinds of services, multiplexes, first-class hospitals, high-speed internet, hotel services, luxury resorts, and hotels of all categories. The land connection in the mid-1960s brought with it enormous economic and demographic growth to the city, as a result of the construction and paving of access roads, from the capital city, Lima, connecting to the central highway in the central highlands and /or with the Fernando Belaunde Terry highway through Pasco and Huanuco; and in the north interconnected to the cities of Bagua, Chachapoyas, Chiclayo, Piura and Trujillo, and with proximity to the largest port in northern Peru, the port of Paita on the Pacific Ocean and the port of Salaverry in La Libertad, in addition to a connection to Brazil through the river port of Yurimaguas, just 3 hours away by road, and its exit to the Atlantic through the Huallaga River, a tributary of the Marañón River and this of the Amazon River.

== History ==
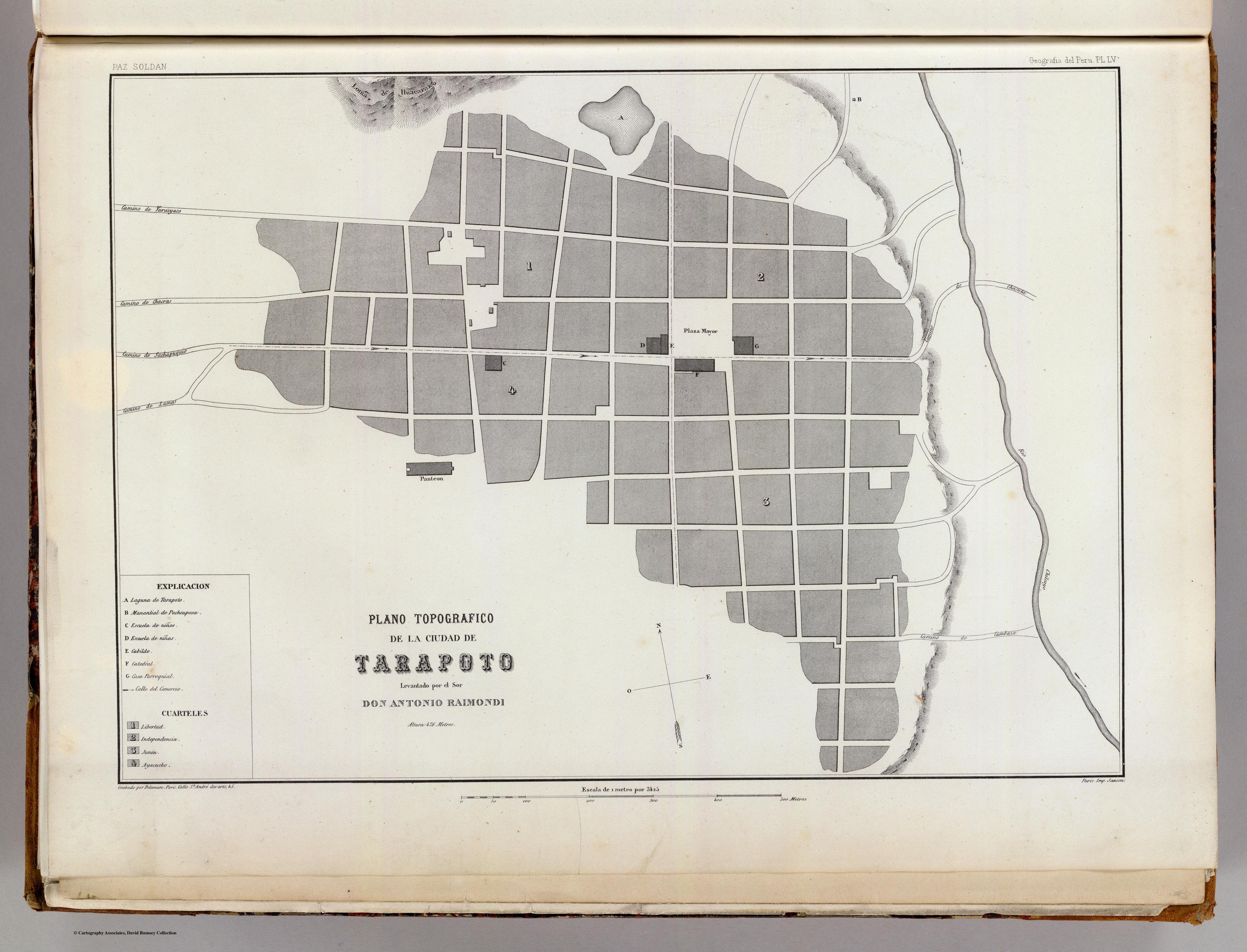
Map of Tarapoto by Antonio Raimoni 1874

Tarapoto was founded on August 20, 1782, by the Spanish bishop Baltasar Jaime Martínez Compañón. Its beginnings date back to the explorations of the Pocras and Chancas (old cultures of the Ayacucho region) who, when being conquered by the Inca Empire, headed a revolution led by the commander Ancohallo; a revolt that, when defeated, forced their tribal members to escape from terrible Inca vengeance.

Eventually settling down in the valleys of the Mayo and Cumbaza rivers, in what is now the Department of San Martín, they possibly formed the town of Lamas, before establishing a satellite in the valley of the rivers Cumbaza and Shilcayo, having as a central nucleus the Suchiche Lagoon (dried up in the colony). In this lagoon grew abundant Taraputus palms, a name that the Spanish bishop would later use when founding the city in this area of hunters and fishermen.

The city is located in the valleys of the Cumbaza and Shilcayo rivers, and is the center of the terrestrial networks and areas between the mountains, the coast and eastern Peru.

== Geography ==
=== Climate ===
Tarapoto experiences a tropical monsoon climate (Köppen climate classification: Am), subject to the Intertropical Convergence Zone rather than the trade winds and with no cyclones. There is constant rainfall throughout the year, however there is a short dry season between June and September. Temperatures range from 21 to 33 °C (70 to 91 °F). The annual average temperature is 25.7 °C (78.3 °F). The average rainfall in Tarapoto is 1,162.2 millimetres (45.8 in) per year. Because the seasons are not sensitive in the equatorial zone, Tarapoto has only two seasons.

The rainy summer arrives in October and ends in June. March and April have the heaviest rains and humidity, with precipitation between 135 and 137 millimetres (5 and 5 in), respectively. In May, the Amazon River, one of the rivers surrounding the city, reaches its highest levels. It falls around 9 to 12 metres (30 to 39 ft) at its lowest point in October, and then steadily rises again cyclically according to rainfall.

Winter offers a drier, sunnier climate. Although June and July are the driest months, they have some periods of downpours. Sunny days and good weather are common, with high temperatures reaching 30 °C (86 °F) and an average of 32 °C (90 °F).

Climate data for Tarapoto, elevation 382 m (1,253 ft), (1991–2020 normals, extremes 1950–present)
Month	Jan	Feb	Mar	Apr	May	Jun	Jul	Aug	Sep	Oct	Nov	Dec	Year
Record high °C (°F)	38.6 (101.5)	40.0 (104.0)	38.8 (101.8)	38.0 (100.4)	38.0 (100.4)	36.1 (97.0)	37.9 (100.2)	39.2 (102.6)	40.4 (104.7)	38.5 (101.3)	38.3 (100.9)	38.0 (100.4)	40.4 (104.7)
Mean daily maximum °C (°F)	32.7 (90.9)	32.2 (90.0)	31.8 (89.2)	31.5 (88.7)	31.4 (88.5)	31.0 (87.8)	31.3 (88.3)	32.9 (91.2)	33.3 (91.9)	33.4 (92.1)	33.3 (91.9)	32.8 (91.0)	32.3 (90.1)
Daily mean °C (°F)	27.9 (82.2)	27.6 (81.7)	27.6 (81.7)	27.4 (81.3)	27.2 (81.0)	26.8 (80.2)	26.5 (79.7)	27.0 (80.6)	27.6 (81.7)	27.9 (82.2)	28.3 (82.9)	28.1 (82.6)	27.5 (81.5)
Mean daily minimum °C (°F)	22.3 (72.1)	22.1 (71.8)	21.9 (71.4)	21.6 (70.9)	21.4 (70.5)	20.8 (69.4)	20.1 (68.2)	20.4 (68.7)	21.0 (69.8)	21.8 (71.2)	22.3 (72.1)	22.4 (72.3)	21.5 (70.7)
Record low °C (°F)	15.0 (59.0)	15.6 (60.1)	17.2 (63.0)	15.0 (59.0)	12.0 (53.6)	10.3 (50.5)	12.0 (53.6)	12.2 (54.0)	15.0 (59.0)	13.9 (57.0)	13.9 (57.0)	15.0 (59.0)	10.3 (50.5)
Average precipitation mm (inches)	136.2 (5.36)	147.5 (5.81)	163.0 (6.42)	160.2 (6.31)	109.3 (4.30)	80.0 (3.15)	68.7 (2.70)	55.7 (2.19)	88.5 (3.48)	112.8 (4.44)	131.2 (5.17)	124.5 (4.90)	1,377.6 (54.23)
Source 1: National Meteorology and Hydrology Service of Peru
Source 2: Meteo Climat (record highs and lows)

== Access and transportation ==
=== Air ===
Tarapoto is one hour by air from Lima and is served by the Cad. FAP Guillermo del Castillo Paredes Airport. This airport is the third-most important in the Peruvian rainforest in flow of passengers and cargo. It operates flights to and from Lima on a daily basis, as well as being a stopover to other cities, such as Iquitos, Pucallpa and Chiclayo, from Lima.

=== Road ===
Lima can be reached by bus in approximately 28 hours. The route runs through Moyobamba and Pedro Ruiz before passing through the coastal city of Chiclayo.

Taxis and motorized rickshaws are frequently used as an inexpensive mode of transportation throughout Tarapoto. Due to the types of the engines used in many taxis, main intersections in Tarapoto are extremely noisy, especially at times of busy traffic. However recently there has been an attempt to certify rickshaws that abide by noise pollution standards.

== Accommodation ==
Tarapoto offers a variety of hotels and guesthouses for tourists and businessmen, both within the city and its surrounding area. A number of resorts also provide for more upmarket tourists.

== Local culture ==
Tarapoto is the site of the headquarters of the National University of San Martín, and the center of the cultural activity of the San Martín region.

== Local food ==
In Tarapoto one can enjoy the most varied food typical of the jungle region. The area is famous for juane, made with rice, egg, olive and chicken, all wrapped up in leaves of bijao. Cured pork products are also common, most notably cecina and chorizo sausage.

Tarapoto is considered the gastronomic capital of the Peruvian Amazon, its variety of typical dishes is the result of the intense miscegenation between the native indigenous cultures of the Amazon, European immigration, Japanese and Chinese immigration (the latter brought rice at the end of the century XIX and at the beginning of the XX century, intensifying its cultivation in the agricultural zone of the city), for which Tarapoto is the cradle of the Amazon gastronomy of Peru for being much older than the cities of Iquitos and Pucallpa. Its known for shrimps, ninajuanes; juane, made from rice, eggs, olives and chicken meat, wrapped in bijao leaves, as well as the chorizo and cecina that have been industrialized and are currently exported to large supermarkets throughout the country.

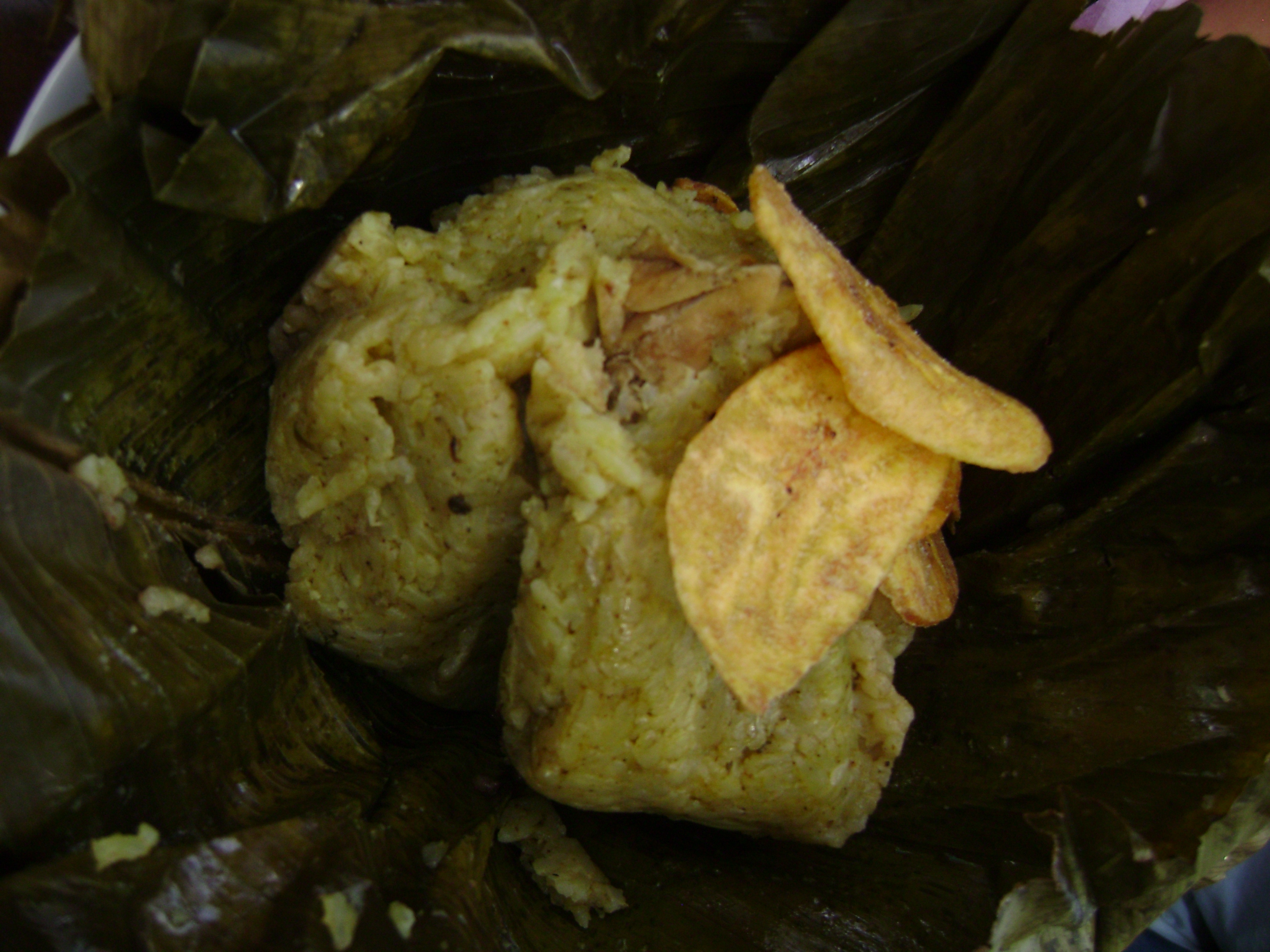
Juane, typical tarapoto food.

In the province of San Martín, especially Tarapoto and in almost the entire Peruvian jungle, there is a wide variety of typical dishes and drinks, which have national and international prestige, due to the proper preparation, the enormous variety of fruits and their diversity of flavours, the ingredients used and because of their exotic nature.

Traditional food:

- Juane: It is a traditional dish at the San Juan festivities. It has the shape of a large tamale, prepared with rice, chicken and eggs; which is wrapped in a leaf called bijao.
- Ninajuane: It is a dish similar to the previous one in its presentation but it is prepared based on beaten eggs with chicken meat and wrapped in a banana leaf. Both are traditionally cooked in the so-called "tushpas", which are typical charcoal or firewood stoves.
- Tacacho with cecina: The tacacho is the fried and mashed banana that is mixed with pork butter, it is usually served accompanied by cecina, which is dried and smoked pork meat; or regional chorizo, which is a sausage prepared with the small intestines of the pig and stuffed with ground meat, but well seasoned.
- Inchicapi: It is a soup prepared with ground or liquefied peanuts, farm chicken, yucca, corn, coriander leaves, garlic, salt and cumin.
- Patarashca: It is a typical food of the jungle, which descends from the ancient settlers. This meal includes any type of fish from the area, wrapped in a banana leaf or from the plant called bijao, and is prepared roasted, baked or parboiled, of course with condiments.
- Timbuche: It is a soup of fresh fish, beaten eggs and cilantro, which is also known as the “raise dead” dish, due to the restorative properties it has after exhausting festive days.
- Meats from the mountains: The San Martin resident also feeds on animal meats that many hunters or "mountains" capture when they go to "mountain" (hunt in the jungle). Among these animals we have: deer, huangana, peccary, tapir or sachavaca, armadillo or carachupa, picuro or majaz, añuje, etc. Which are prepared in various ways, roasted, parboiled, in soups, fried, etc.
- Rumo-Api and Sara-Api: They are soups prepared with the previously mentioned bushmeat (wild animals), accompanied with ground cassava and ground corn, respectively.
- Masato: prepared drink made up of cassava, formerly it was chewed and allowed to ferment for approximately 8 days, this custom still persists in the native ethnic groups, currently it is prepared by blending it and adding yeast for fermentation, facilitating its consumption.
- Chicha de Maíz: a drink produced by the fermentation of corn, mixed with figs and leaves from the area, in ancient times, the fermentation of this drink was used as a liquor.
- Poroto Shirumbe: Typical food made with pork or pork legs, yucca and tarapotino beans or huasca beans91 (Phaseolus vulgaris).
- Aguajina: soft drink made from the pulp of the aguaje.
- Cocona: soft drink made from the fruit of the cocona.
- Chapo: soft drink made from ripe bananas In addition to liquors and exotic drinks typical of the Tarapotina culture: Rompecalzón (RC) (Pantybreaker ) Indanachado Siete Raíces (seven roots) 21 raices (21 roots) Uvachado Chuchuhuasi Huitochado Para para Siete Veces Sin Sacar (Seven Times Without Drawing) Levántate Lázaro (Arise Lazarus) Cerezachado y Acerola (Cherry and Acerola) Surichado Licor de Café (Coffee liquor) Licor de Aguaje (Aguaje Liqueur) Licor de Camu Camu (Camu Camu liqueur) Licor de Uva regional (Regional Grape Liqueur) Guarapo Licor de menta (Mint liquor) Macerados (macerated)

== Nearby tourist attractions ==
The animal rescue Centre Urku, the spa of Cumbaza, the archaeological remains of the petroglyphs of Polish (Bello Horizonte), abundant plant and animal life, the waterfalls of:

- Ahuashiyacu Falls
- Tamushal
- Pucayaquillo
- Huacamaillo
- Pishurayacu,
- Ahuashillo
- Tamushal
- Taytayacu
- Union Waterfall
- Toroyacu o Sunipicausani Falls
- Talliquihui
- Sabaloyacu
- Tununtunumba Falls
- and the Venice Lagoon are just a few of the area's attractions.

It is close to the lake called Sauce or Laguna Azul (Blue Lagoon)

Visitors can see a landscape with a wide variety of flora and fauna, numerous waterfalls and opportunities for adventure tourism (such as white water rafting on the Mayo River, abseiling, jungle expeditions and treks). Tarapoto is also one of the access points to the remote, Rio Abiseo National Park.

== Education ==
The city's oldest school dates back to 1900, when it was established under the name of "San Miguel" by Juan Jiménez Pimentel, an educator originally from Piura. Following his death, the school was named after him.

For the top level university, Tarapoto has the Universidad Nacional de San Martín (National University of General San Martín) with 15 professional careers: Accounting, Agroindustrial Engineering (Juanjui), Agroindustry, Agronomy, Architecture, Civil Engineering, Ecology (Moyobamba), Education-Primary and Secondary (Rioja), Economics, Languages, Management, Medicine, Midwifery, Nursing, Systems Engineering, and Tourism Management.

The National University of San Martín includes an important museum, the Museo Regional-UNSM, which is operated through FUDES (Fundación Para el Desarrollo de la Selva-Universidad Nacional de San Martín). The Regional Museum of the National University of San Martin has a notable anthropology section, which includes both ethnographic and archaeological collections from Peruvian Amazonia.

There are other universities with satellite campuses in Tarapoto. The Universidad César Vallejo offers careers in Accounting, Law, Psychology, Management, Systems Engineering. Other schools include the Universidad Peruana Union, the Universidad Alas Peruanas, the Instituto Superior Público de Tarapoto, the Instituto Superior Tecnológico Nororiental de la Selva, and numerous private vocational education centers. For special education, Tarapoto has the Education Centre No. 001 for children with Mental Retardation and/or physical limitations and Education Centre No. 002 or Blind Rehabilitation Center (CREC) for the visually impaired.

== See also ==
- Comandante FAP Guillermo del Castillo Paredes Airport - Tarapoto's airport
- Lamas, Peru - a town near Tarapoto
- Peruvian Amazon
- San Martín Province
- San Martín Region
- Tarapoto District
- Unión Tarapoto - Tarapoto's football (soccer) team.
