= List of earthquakes in 2019 =

Earthquakes in 2019
Approximate epicenters of notable earthquakes in 2019
- 4.0–5.9 magnitude
- 6.0–6.9 magnitude
- 7.0–7.9 magnitude
- 8.0+ magnitude
- Strongest: 8.0 M_{w} Peru
- Deadliest: 6.4 M_{w} (Albania) Albania; 51 deaths
- Total fatalities: 288

Number by magnitude
- 9.0+: 0
- 8.0–8.9: 1
- 7.0–7.9: 9
- 6.0–6.9: 133
- 5.0–5.9: 1,489
- 4.0–4.9: 11,349

This is a list of earthquakes in 2019. Only earthquakes of magnitude 6 or above are included, unless they result in damage and/or casualties, or are notable for other reasons. All dates are listed according to UTC time. Maximum intensities are indicated on the Modified Mercalli intensity scale and are sourced from United States Geological Survey (USGS) ShakeMap data. This year was not very active with only ten major quakes, and the death toll was the lowest since 2000. However, Albania experienced its strongest tremor in decades, and various deadly events struck Indonesia, Pakistan and the Philippines. The only 8+ quake occurred in Peru in May, but it did not cause much damage because of its great depth.

== Compared to other years ==
Number of earthquakes worldwide for 2009–2019
Magnitude	2009	2010	2011	2012	2013	2014	2015	2016	2017	2018	2019
8.0–9.9	1	1	1	2	2	1	1	0	1	1	1
7.0–7.9	16	21	19	15	17	11	18	16	6	16	9
6.0–6.9	144	151	204	129	125	140	124	128	106	117	133
5.0–5.9	1,896	1,963	2,271	1,412	1,402	1,475	1,413	1,502	1,451	1,675	1,489
4.0–4.9	6,805	10,164	13,303	10,990	9,795	13,494	13,239	12,771	11,296	12,777	11,349
Total	8,862	12,309	15,798	12,548	11,341	15,121	14,795	14,420	12,860	14,586	12,985

An increase in detected earthquake numbers does not necessarily represent an increase in earthquakes per se. Population increase, habitation spread, and advances in earthquake detection technology all contribute to higher earthquake numbers being recorded over time.

== By death toll ==
Rank	Death toll	Magnitude	Location	MMI	Depth (km)	Date
1	51	6.4	Albania, Durrës	VIII (Severe)	20.0	November 26
2	41	6.5	Indonesia, Maluku offshore	VII (Very strong)	18.2	September 25
3	40	5.6	Pakistan, Azad Kashmir	VII (Very strong)	10.0	September 24
4	18	6.1	Philippines, Central Luzon	VII (Very strong)	21.8	April 22
5	14	7.2	Indonesia, North Maluku	VI (Strong)	20.0	July 14
5	14	6.6	Philippines, Soccsksargen	VII (Very strong)	15.0	October 29
7	13	5.8	China, Sichuan	VIII (Severe)	6.0	June 17
7	13	6.8	Philippines, Davao	VII (Very strong)	18.0	December 15
9	10	6.5	Philippines, Soccsksargen	VII (Very strong)	10.0	October 31

Listed are earthquakes with at least 10 dead.

== By magnitude ==
Rank	Magnitude	Death toll	Location	MMI	Depth (km)	Date	Event
1	8.0	2	Peru, Loreto	VII (Very strong)	122.8	May 26	2019 Peru earthquake
2	7.6	0	Papua New Guinea, East New Britain offshore	VII (Very strong)	10.0	May 14	
3	7.5	1	Ecuador, Pastaza	VII (Very strong)	145.0	February 22	
4	7.3	0	New Zealand, Kermadec Islands offshore	VII (Very strong)	46.0	June 15	
4	7.3	0	Indonesia offshore, Banda Sea	VI (Strong)	212.0	June 24	
6	7.2	14	Indonesia, North Maluku	VI (Strong)	20.0	July 14	2019 North Maluku earthquake
7	7.1	1	United States, California	IX (Violent)	8.0	July 5	2019 Ridgecrest earthquakes
7	7.1	0	Papua New Guinea, Morobe	VII (Very strong)	146.0	May 6	
7	7.1	1	Indonesia offshore, Molucca Sea	VII (Very strong)	33.0	November 14	
10	7.0	1	Peru, Puno	IV (Light)	267.0	March 1	

Listed are earthquakes with at least 7.0 magnitude.

== By month ==
=== January ===
January
- Strongest: 6.8 M_{w} Brazil
- Deadliest: 6.7 M_{w} Chile; 2 deaths
- Total fatalities: 5

Number by magnitude
- 8.0–8.9: 0
- 7.0–7.9: 0
- 6.0–6.9: 12
- 5.0–5.9: 147
- 4.0–4.9: 1,041

Date	Country and location	M_{w}	Depth (km)	MMI	Notes	Casualties	
Date	Country and location	M_{w}	Depth (km)	MMI	Notes	Dead	Injured
3	China, Sichuan, 35 km southeast of Xunchang	4.8	10.0	V	Some houses were destroyed in Gongxian county. One person was slightly injured.	-	1
3	Japan, Fukuoka, 2 km northeast of Ōmuta	4.7	10.0	V	Light damage was reported in Nagomi, and an elderly woman sustained minor injuries in Mashiki. Both locations are in the Kumamoto prefecture.	-	1
5	Brazil, Acre, 90 km west of Tarauacá	6.8	570.4	III	-	-	-
5	Peru, Puno, 12 km southeast of Ocuviri	5.0	30.6	V	At least five adobe houses were damaged in the epicentral area.	-	-
6	Iran, Kermanshah, 40 km south southwest of Sarpol-e Zahab	5.6	14.0	VII	About 75 people were injured in the city of Gilangharb. Some residential buildings were damaged, as well as roads.	-	75
6	Indonesia offshore, Molucca Sea, 151 km west northwest of Tobelo	6.6	43.2	IV	-	-	-
8	Japan, Kagoshima offshore, 16 km south southeast of Nishinoomote	6.3	35.0	VI	-	-	-
9	Argentina, Neuquén, 28 km south southeast of Añelo	3.4	1.0	-	There was a fall of furniture and some damage to masonry, like cracks on walls. It was felt in Añelo, Cutral Có and Neuquén.	-	-
12	Poland, Lower Silesia, 5 km north northeast of Polkowice	3.8	5.0	V	This small earthquake caused a mine collapse in Rudna. One miner died and six others were injured, three of them in a serious condition.	1	6
15	Vanuatu, Torba offshore, 94 km northwest of Sola	6.6	35.0	IV	-	-	-
17	Papua New Guinea, Manus offshore, Bismarck Sea, 164 km southwest of Lorengau	6.2	10.0	IV	-	-	-
18	Vanuatu, Tafea offshore, 67 km west northwest of Isangel	6.0	38.7	III	-	-	-
20	Chile, Coquimbo, 10 km south southwest of Coquimbo	6.7	63.0	VIII	The 2019 Coquimbo earthquake caused moderate damage in hospitals, buildings, houses and serious damage in the historic center of Coquimbo and La Serena, as well as rock slides on desert roads. Two people died of heart attacks.	2	-
21	Indonesia, East Nusa Tenggara offshore, 142 km west southwest of Waingapu	6.0	26.0	IV	It was a foreshock of the 6.3 quake a few hours later.	-	-
22	Indonesia, East Nusa Tenggara offshore, 160 km west southwest of Waingapu	6.3	24.0	IV	-	-	-
22	South Africa offshore, Prince Edward Islands region	6.7	13.0	III	-	-	-
22	Poland, Lower Silesia, Jejkowice	3.9	5.5	VII	This quake caused a mine collapse in Rydułtowy coal mine. As a result of this incident, one miner died and eight others suffered light injuries.	1	8
25	Peru, Ica, 15 km west northwest of Llipata	5.7	60.5	IV	Some adobe houses collapsed and six people suffered light injuries.	-	6
26	Solomon Islands, Choiseul offshore, 116 km southeast of Kieta, Papua New Guinea	6.2	355.0	I	-	-	-
26	Colombia, Huila, 13 km northwest of Santa María	5.6	10.0	VI	Various houses were damaged near the epicenter. One woman died of a heart attack.	1	-
26	Indonesia, Maluku offshore, 113 km east of Tual	5.9	10.0	V	Three houses and one hospital were damaged in Aru Islands. One girl was injured.	-	1
26	Fiji, Lau offshore, 377 km south southeast of Levuka	6.2	588.0	-	-	-	-
29	Poland, Lower Silesia, 3 km south of Grębocice	4.9	10.0	VI	A mine collapse occurred at Rudna coal mine. Fifteen miners were injured, some of them in a serious condition.	-	15

=== February ===
February
- Strongest: 7.5 M_{w} Ecuador
- Deadliest: 4.9 M_{w} China; 2 deaths
- Total fatalities: 4

Number by magnitude
- 8.0–8.9: 0
- 7.0–7.9: 1
- 6.0–6.9: 5
- 5.0–5.9: 97
- 4.0–4.9: 937

Date	Country and location	M_{w}	Depth (km)	MMI	Notes	Casualties	
Date	Country and location	M_{w}	Depth (km)	MMI	Notes	Dead	Injured
1	India, Maharashtra, 10 km southeast of Dahanu	4.1	5.0	-	A two-year-old girl died after falling in a panic caused by the quake. There were also some reports of wall collapse.	1	-
1	Mexico, Chiapas, 5 km southwest of Puerto Madero	6.7	66.0	VI	More than 100 buildings were damaged in Chiapas, and one minor suffered a broken leg. In the neighbouring Guatemala, 15 people were slightly injured, and some houses also suffered structural damage.	-	16
2	Indonesia, West Sumatra offshore, 170 km west southwest of Sungai Penuh	6.0	20.0	VI	Eleven houses were destroyed, and a church and a health center were damaged in Mentawai Islands.	-	-
4	Dominican Republic, La Altagracia offshore, 27 km south southeast of Boca de Yuma	5.3	74.0	V	At least 20 schools and other public buildings suffered minor damage.	-	-
5	Azerbaijan, Ismaili, 23 km northeast of Basqal	5.0	10.0	VI	Many houses were damaged, and cracks appeared on the walls of five schools. Thirty people needed medical assistance, three of them for serious injuries.	-	30
10	Iran, Hormozgan, 73 km west northwest of Qeshm	5.4	10.0	VII	Five people were hospitalized after the quake, and several buildings damaged.	-	5
12	Northern Mariana Islands offshore, 423 km north of Saipan	6.0	144.3	III	-	-	-
14	Peru, Huancavelica, 49 km north northeast of Paucarbamba	5.5	10.0	VII	Eight health centers were damaged, as well as houses and some buildings. Two people were injured, including an army officer.	-	2
14	Northern Mid-Atlantic Ridge	6.2	10.0	I	-	-	-
17	Papua New Guinea, New Ireland, 95 km north of Rabaul	6.4	368.1	I	-	-	-
20	Thailand, Lampang, 26 km southwest of Mae Chai	4.6	10.0	VI	At least 15 buildings were damaged, including a pagoda. No injuries were reported.	-	-
20	Turkey, Çanakkale, 10 km north of Ayvacık	5.1	10.0	VI	85 houses and two mosques were damaged near the epicenter. 21 people were injured.	-	21
21	Japan, Hokkaido, 25 km east southeast of Chitose	5.4	28.0	VI	This was an aftershock of the 2018 Hokkaido Eastern Iburi earthquake. The quake caused an avalanche in Atsuma and five people were slightly hurt in Sapporo, Tomakomai and Noboribetsu.	-	5
22	Ecuador, Pastaza, 115 km east southeast of Palora	7.5	145.0	VII	During the earthquake slight damage was reported, including broken windows and cracks in walls. One person died of a heart attack, and nine others were injured.	1	9
25	China, Sichuan, 21 km northwest of Zigong	4.9	10.0	VI	Nine houses were destroyed in Gongxian county. Two people were killed by a falling balcony guard bar and 12 people were injured, three of them seriously. Authorities have halted shale gas mining after the quake.	2	12
27	Iran, Lorestan, 14 km east northeast of Abdanan	4.6	10.0	V	Slight damage to houses occurred, like cracked walls and broken windows. Seventeen people were injured.	-	17
27	Indonesia, Sumatra, 83 km north northeast of Sungai Penuh	5.4	10.0	VI	At least 48 people were injured and more than 350 houses damaged in South Solok district.	-	48

=== March ===
March
- Strongest: 7.0 M_{w} Peru
- Deadliest: 5.6 M_{w} Indonesia; 6 deaths
- Total fatalities: 8

Number by magnitude
- 8.0–8.9: 0
- 7.0–7.9: 1
- 6.0–6.9: 11
- 5.0–5.9: 123
- 4.0–4.9: 989

Date	Country and location	M_{w}	Depth (km)	MMI	Notes	Casualties	
Date	Country and location	M_{w}	Depth (km)	MMI	Notes	Dead	Injured
1	Peru, Puno, 22 km north northeast of Azángaro	7.0	267.0	IV	Some rockslides occurred in Arequipa region. One person died of a heart attack, and two others were injured in a panic during the evacuation.	1	2
6	New Zealand, Kermadec Islands offshore, 116 km southeast of L'Esperance Rock	6.4	29.0	I	-	-	-
7	Argentina, Neuquén, 19 km south southwest of Añelo	5.0	13.8	V	Various houses suffered damage, cracks in walls appeared, as well as damage to masonry.	-	-
8	Philippines, Caraga offshore, 40 km north of Santa Monica	6.0	30.0	III	-	-	-
10	Fiji, Macuata offshore, 221 km east of Levuka	6.2	578.2	-	-	-	-
10	Papua New Guinea, Milne Bay offshore, 162 km east northeast of Samarai	6.0	9.0	IV	-	-	-
12	United States, Isabela, Puerto Rico, 3 km south southwest of Jobos	4.6	13.0	V	Slight damage to some buildings was caused. One woman was also injured, after suffering a car accident during the quake.	-	1
15	Bolivia, Cochabamba, 31 km south southeast of Tarata	6.3	359.0	IV	-	-	-
17	Indonesia, Lombok, 18 km west northwest of Labuan Lombok	5.6	10.0	VI	Six people, including two Malaysian tourists, died, while 182 people were injured in the quake. About 1,500 homes were damaged, including 32 that were flattened by the 2019 Lombok earthquake.	6	182
20	Turkey, Denizli, 16 km east of Acıpayam	5.7	8.0	VII	The quake demolished some homes, mostly in rural areas. Three people sustained light injuries.	-	3
20	France, Nouvelle-Aquitaine, 5 km north northeast of Montendre	4.5	10.0	V	Slight damage was reported near the epicenter, like fallen chimneys and cracks in walls. It was the strongest earthquake in the region since 1759.	-	-
20	Vanuatu, Penama offshore, 53 km east of Luganville	6.3	119.0	V	-	-	-
21	Tanzania, Rukwa, 54 km east of Sumbawanga	5.5	22.0	VI	At least four houses collapsed in the Mbeya region, while other buildings showed cracks and other signs of damage. One person died, crushed by a wall.	1	-
23	Colombia, Valle del Cauca, 3 km west southwest of Versalles	6.1	122.0	V	Some damage occurred in Manizales, especially in the council where many glasses were broken.	-	-
24	Indonesia offshore, Molucca Sea, 146 km northwest of Ternate	6.1	45.0	V	-	-	-
24	Kenya, Taita-Taveta, 41 km south southwest of Mtito Andei	4.7	10.0	VII	The Naivasha-Mai Mahiu Road sustained cracks. 18 students were injured while fleeing in panic.	-	18
28	Russia, Kamchatka offshore, 266 km east southeast of Ozernovskiy	6.2	9.0	IV	-	-	-
30	Papua New Guinea, East New Britain, 108 km east of Kimbe	6.2	41.0	V	-	-	-
31	Ecuador, Santa Elena offshore, 31 km north of Santa Elena	6.2	18.0	VI	Some houses suffered damage in Santa Elena region, but no injuries were reported.	-	-

=== April ===
April
- Strongest: 6.8 M_{w} Indonesia
- Deadliest: 6.1 M_{w} Philippines; 18 deaths
- Total fatalities: 20

Number by magnitude
- 8.0–8.9: 0
- 7.0–7.9: 0
- 6.0–6.9: 16
- 5.0–5.9: 123
- 4.0–4.9: 1,021

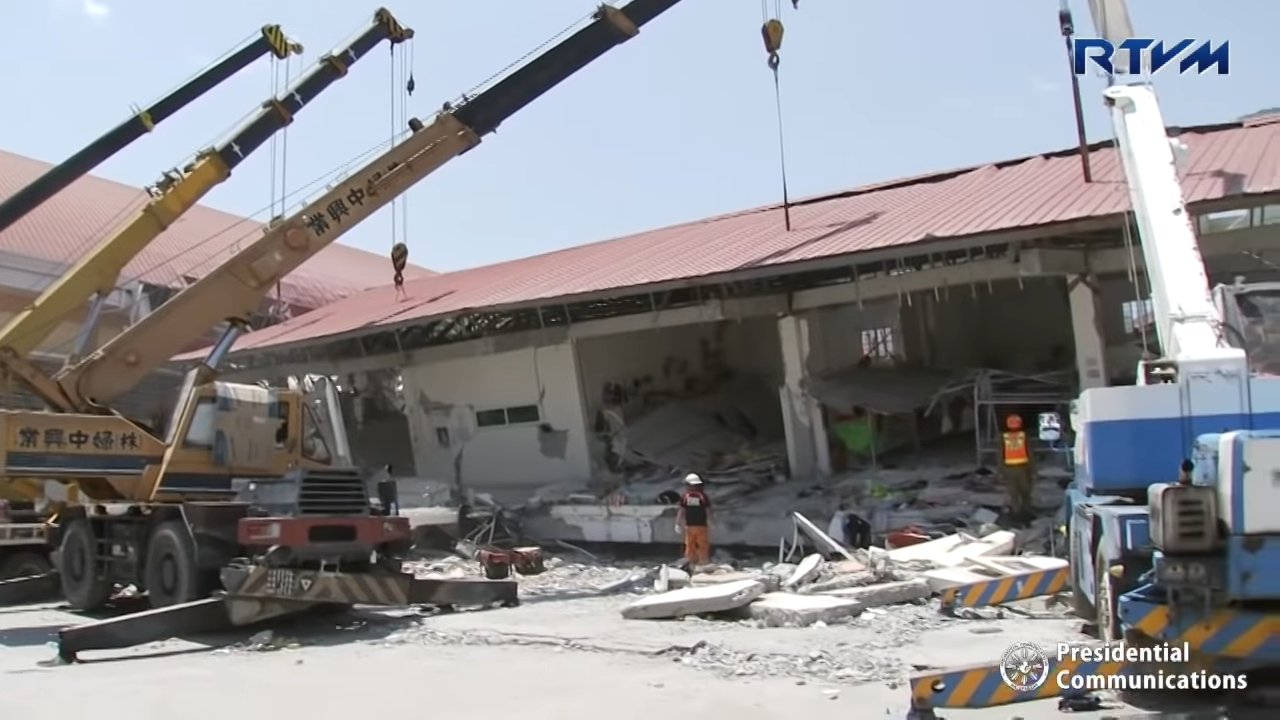
A partially collapsed supermarket in Porac, caused by the 2019 Luzon earthquake.

Date	Country and location	M_{w}	Depth (km)	MMI	Notes	Casualties	
Date	Country and location	M_{w}	Depth (km)	MMI	Notes	Dead	Injured
1	Mauritius, Rodrigues Island offshore, 262 km northeast of Port Mathurin	6.0	10.0	I	-	-	-
2	Indonesia, East Java offshore, 74 km northeast of Panji	4.9	35.0	IV	Extensive damage to eight buildings was caused in Raas Island. Two people were injured.	-	2
2	United States, Alaska offshore, Aleutian Islands, 32 km east northeast of Kiska Island	6.4	8.0	VI	-	-	-
5	South Georgia and the South Sandwich Islands offshore, 95 km north northwest of Visokoi Island	6.4	57.0	V	-	-	-
6	East Timor offshore, Banda Sea, 197 km north of Liquiçá	6.3	539.0	II	-	-	-
9	South Georgia and the South Sandwich Islands offshore, 83 km east northeast of Bristol Island	6.5	38.0	V	-	-	-
11	Japan, Iwate offshore, 143 km northeast of Miyako	6.0	18.0	III	-	-	-
12	Indonesia, Sulawesi offshore, 99 km south southwest of Luwuk	6.8	15.5	VI	One person died, when falling in a panic caused by a brief tsunami warning. Slight damage was caused.	1	-
12	Tonga, Niuatoputapu offshore, 121 km east northeast of Hihifo	6.0	15.4	IV	-	-	-
12	Papua New Guinea, West New Britain offshore, 94 km west southwest of Kandrian	6.0	30.0	IV	-	-	-
14	United States, Hawaii, 20 km east of Kalaoa	5.3	13.3	VII	Power outages, small rockfalls, and minor damage to buildings occurred. No injuries were reported.	-	-
15	Iran, Kermanshah, 25 km northwest of Sarpol-e-Zahab	4.4	10.0	-	A construction worker was injured by falling scaffolding.	-	1
18	Taiwan, Hualien offshore, 8 km northeast of Hualien City	6.1	20.0	VI	During the 2019 Hualien earthquake, light damage was caused, like cracked roads. Two hikers were injured by falling rocks, one of them in a critical condition who later died, and 15 people sustained light injuries in Taipei.	1	16
18	Western Indian-Antarctic Ridge	6.3	10.0	-	-	-	-
22	Philippines, Central Luzon, 3 km west southwest of San Francisco	6.1	21.8	VII	During the 2019 Luzon earthquake, 18 people were killed and more than 280 injured when various buildings collapsed in Porac and Lubao, including a supermarket. Power was cut in several towns, and the province of Pampanga was primarily hit with 29 structures/buildings suffering damage.	18	256
22	South Georgia and the South Sandwich Islands offshore, 49 km north of Visokoi Island	6.0	79.0	V	-	-	-
23	Philippines, Eastern Visayas, 17 km east southeast of Tutubigan	6.4	56.0	VI	During the 2019 Visayas earthquake, slight damage was caused near the epicenter, cracks in the walls and roads. 48 people were injured, most of them slightly by falling objects.	-	48
23	Tonga offshore, south of the Fiji Islands	6.0	385.6	-	-	-	-
23	India, Arunachal Pradesh, 22 km southeast of Shi Yomi	5.9	14.0	VII	Various houses and roads suffered damage in Shi Yomi district. Landslides also occurred and blocked roads.	-	-
29	Yemen, Socotra Island offshore, Carlsberg Ridge	6.3	10.0	-	-	-	-

=== May ===
May
- Strongest: 8.0 M_{w} Peru
- Deadliest: 8.0 M_{w} Peru; 2 deaths
- Total fatalities: 3

Number by magnitude
- 8.0–8.9: 1
- 7.0–7.9: 2
- 6.0–6.9: 10
- 5.0–5.9: 103
- 4.0–4.9: 901

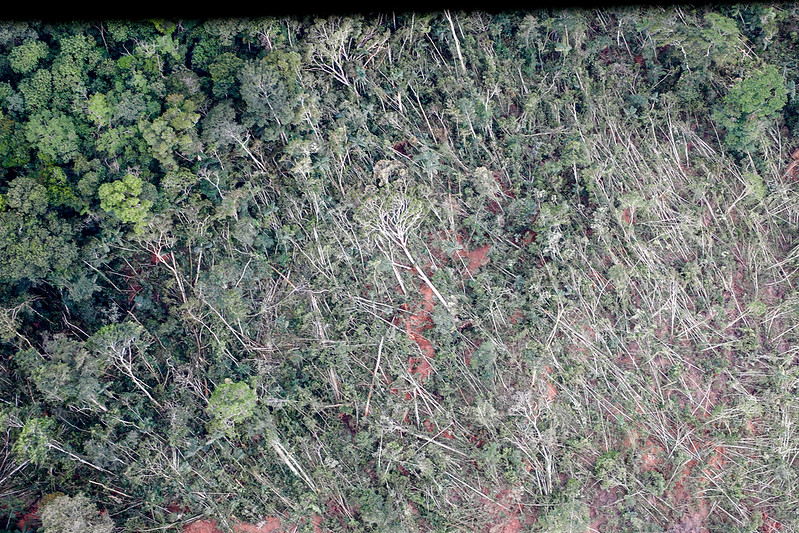
A forest in Ucayali Province, flattened by the 2019 Peru earthquake.

Date	Country and location	M_{w}	Depth (km)	MMI	Notes	Casualties	
Date	Country and location	M_{w}	Depth (km)	MMI	Notes	Dead	Injured
3	Solomon Islands, Isabel offshore, 144 km north northeast of Buala	6.2	27.0	IV	-	-	-
6	Papua New Guinea, Morobe, 32 km north northwest of Bulolo	7.1	146.0	VII	Tremors were felt in Queensland, Australia. Some damage was caused in Lae, like fallen objects and power outages. More than 130 houses and a school were also destroyed in Lata Butu village, but no casualties were reported.	-	-
9	Japan, Miyazaki offshore, 43 km east southeast of Miyazaki	6.2	22.0	VI	A man was injured and local traffic networks disrupted.	-	1
12	Costa Rica, Puntarenas, 1 km west of Breñón, Panama	6.0	19.0	VII	Some buildings were damaged in Chiriquí province in neighbouring Panama, where five people were injured. Slight damage also occurred in Costa Rica.	-	5
14	Papua New Guinea, East New Britain offshore, 48 km northeast of Kokopo	7.6	10.0	VII	A tsunami warning was issued for Papua New Guinea and Solomon Islands. Several houses collapsed and power was cut in Duke of York Islands, where one woman was injured.	-	1
16	Nicaragua, Chinandega offshore, 41 km west southwest of Jiquilillo	5.9	72.0	V	In El Salvador, around 15 houses were damaged in La Unión Department. A small landslide blocked a road from El Delirio to El Cuco in San Miguel department.	-	-
17	China, Jilin, 15 km west of Fuyu	4.8	16.5	V	More than 160 houses were damaged in Ningjiang District and 75 people had to be relocated.	-	-
19	New Caledonia, Loyalty Islands offshore, 196 km east of Tadine	6.3	20.0	II	This pair of similarly sized quakes occurring in close proximity is an example of a doublet earthquake.	-	-
19	New Caledonia, Loyalty Islands offshore, 164 km east of Tadine	6.3	20.0	IV	This pair of similarly sized quakes occurring in close proximity is an example of a doublet earthquake.	-	-
19	New Caledonia, Loyalty Islands offshore, 176 km east of Tadine	6.0	16.0	-	-	-	-
21	Italy, Apulia, 3 km north of Barletta	4.0	10.0	-	A church was slightly damaged in Trani. Several buildings were evacuated, including several schools and a courthouse.	-	-
22	Netherlands, Groningen, 1 km east of Warffum	3.2	10.0	IV	Around 800 buildings were damaged. It is caused by gas extraction in the Groningen gas field.	-	-
23	United States, Alaska offshore, Aleutian Islands, 127 km west southwest of Adak	6.0	30.0	IV	-	-	-
24	Russia, Dagestan, 9 km west northwest of Korkmaskala	4.5	10.0	-	Some damage was caused, such as cracks on walls and ceilings.	-	-
26	Peru, Loreto, 78 km northeast of Navarro	8.0	122.6	VII	The 2019 Peru earthquake caused damage in northeastern Peru, as well as in southern Ecuador. Two people were killed (one of them by falling rocks in Cajamarca), and 30 people were injured, 15 in Peru and 15 in Ecuador. This was the largest earthquake in 2019.	2	30
30	El Salvador, La Libertad offshore, 32 km south of La Libertad	6.6	57.9	VI	Slight damage (like cracks in walls, or fallen objects in supermarkets) was observed near the epicenter, and in San Salvador. One person died of a heart attack, and another was injured by a falling wall.	1	1
30	Tonga, Tongatapu offshore, 132 km west southwest of Haveluloto	6.0	177.9	IV	-	-	-
31	Philippines, Davao offshore, 34 km east southeast of Pundaguitan	6.1	98.7	IV	-	-	-

=== June ===
June
- Strongest: 7.3 M_{w} New Zealand; 7.3 M_{w} Indonesia
- Deadliest: 5.8 M_{w} China; 13 deaths
- Total fatalities: 13

Number by magnitude
- 8.0–8.9: 0
- 7.0–7.9: 2
- 6.0–6.9: 16
- 5.0–5.9: 141
- 4.0–4.9: 1,028

Date	Country and location	M_{w}	Depth (km)	MMI	Notes	Casualties	
Date	Country and location	M_{w}	Depth (km)	MMI	Notes	Dead	Injured
1	Albania, Korçë, 12 km southwest of Mborje	5.2	10.0	VI	More than 100 houses were damaged and 5 people were injured when a house collapsed in Korçë.	-	5
2	Tonga, Eua offshore, 108 km east of Ohonua	6.0	10.0	-	-	-	-
4	Japan, Izu Islands offshore	6.4	422.0	III	-	-	-
14	Chile, Coquimbo offshore, 72 km west of Coquimbo	6.4	11.0	V	A tsunami was observed with heights of 7 cm in La Serena.	-	-
15	Tonga, Eua offshore, 82 km east northeast of Ohonua	6.1	13.0	IV	-	-	-
15	New Zealand, Kermadec Islands offshore, 116 km northeast of L'Esperance Rock	7.3	46.0	VI	A tsunami warning was issued, and a surge of 14 cm was observed in Raoul Island.	-	-
16	New Zealand, Kermadec Islands offshore, 91 km east northeast of L'Esperance Rock	6.3	21.0	II	These were aftershocks of the 7.3 quake on June 15.	-	-
17	New Zealand, Kermadec Islands offshore, 150 km east northeast of L'Esperance Rock	6.1	12.0	-	These were aftershocks of the 7.3 quake on June 15.	-	-
17	China, Sichuan, 22 km east southeast of Xunchang	5.8	6.0	VIII	During the 2019 Sichuan earthquake, buildings were damaged and some destroyed in Changning county. 13 people died, and 220 others were injured. The quake was strongly felt in the city of Yibin.	13	220
18	Japan, Yamagata offshore, 31 km west southwest of Tsuruoka	6.4	12.0	VII	During the 2019 Yamagata earthquake, a tsunami warning was issued, and a surge of 10 cm was observed at Niigata. 26 people were also injured, mostly by fallen objects.	-	26
19	New Zealand, Kermadec Islands offshore, 139 km south of Raoul Island	6.4	30.0	-	It was an aftershock of the 7.3 quake on June 15.	-	-
19	Indonesia, Papua, 244 km west of Abepura	6.3	10.0	VII	39 buildings were slightly damaged, including two schools and a church.	-	-
21	New Zealand, Kermadec Islands offshore, 150 km east northeast of L'Esperance Rock	6.2	14.0	-	It was an aftershock of the 7.3 quake on June 15.	-	-
22	China, Sichuan, 11 km southeast of Xunchang	5.3	10.0	VI	Damage was observed in Gong County and 31 people were injured. It was an aftershock of the 5.8 quake on June 17.	-	31
23	United States, California, 6 km south southwest of Petrolia	5.6	9.4	VII	Some damage, such as items knocked off shelves, were observed.	-	-
24	Indonesia, Papua, 230 km west of Abepura	6.1	28.0	VI	It was an aftershock of the 6.3 quake on June 19.	-	-
24	Indonesia offshore, Banda Sea, 292 km northwest of Saumlaki	7.3	212.0	VI	The earthquake was felt as far as Darwin, Australia, where cracks appeared on some houses.	-	-
25	Russia, Kamchatka offshore, 108 km east of Ust-Kamchatsk	6.4	10.0	V		-	-
26	Russia, Kamchatka offshore, 100 km east of Ust-Kamchatsk	6.3	10.0	V	It was an aftershock of the 6.4 quake a day earlier.	-	-
26	Panama, Chiriquí, 4 km southeast of Aserrío de Gariché	6.2	32.6	VI	Some houses were damaged in Panama, as well as in neighbouring Costa Rica. Power was cut in various cities near the epicenter and one person was injured by a falling roof.	-	1
27	New Zealand, Kermadec Islands offshore, 118 km north northwest of L'Esperance Rock	6.3	10.0	VII	It was an aftershock of the 7.3 quake on June 15.	-	-
29	Northern Mariana Islands offshore, 95 km southwest of Farallon de Pajaros	6.4	410.0	III	-	-	-

=== July ===
July
- Strongest: 7.2 M_{w} Indonesia
- Deadliest: 7.2 M_{w} Indonesia; 14 deaths
- Total fatalities: 31

Number by magnitude
- 8.0–8.9: 0
- 7.0–7.9: 2
- 6.0–6.9: 11
- 5.0–5.9: 140
- 4.0–4.9: 1,097

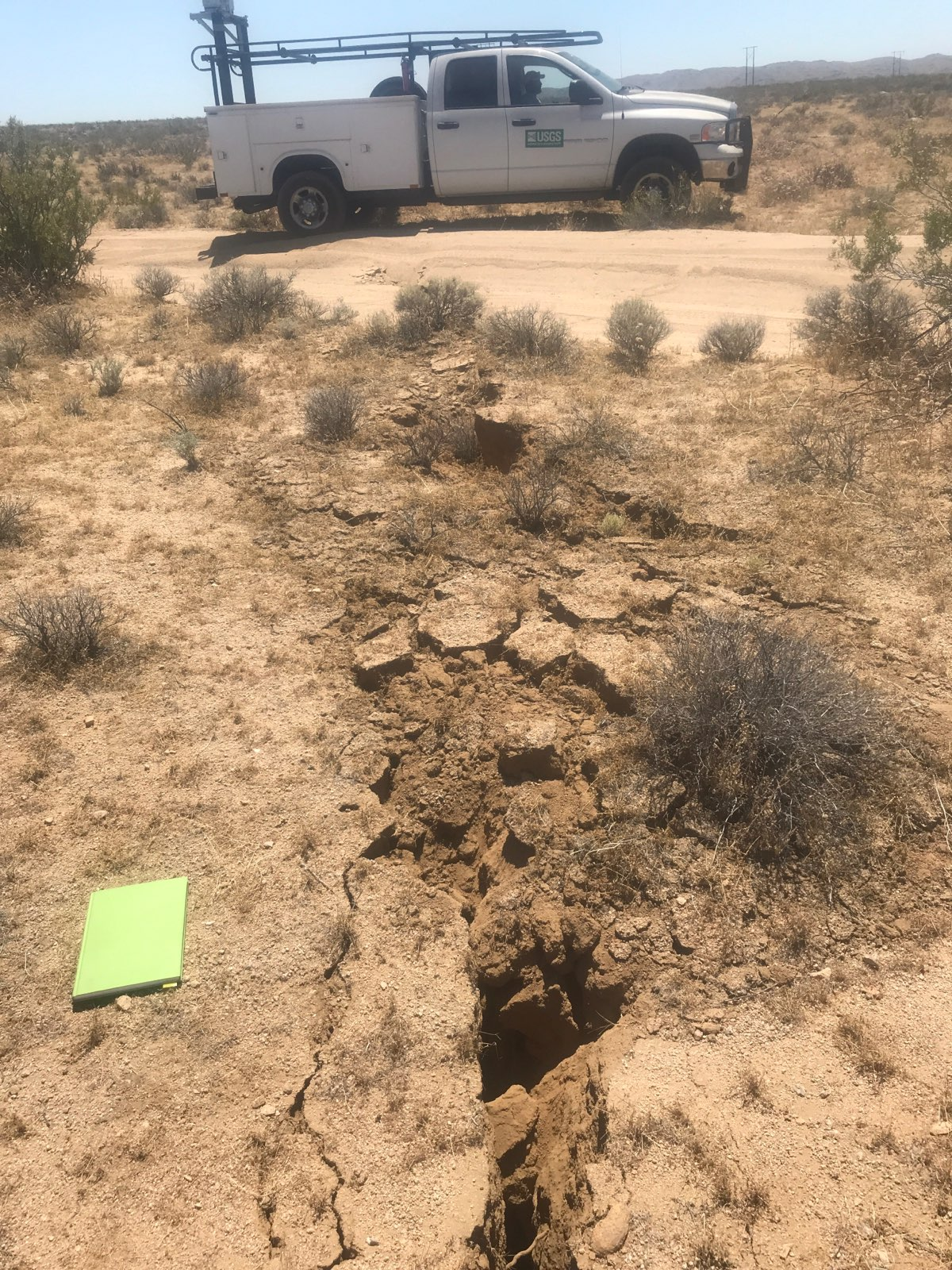
Surface rupture associated with the July 4, 2019 earthquake in California.

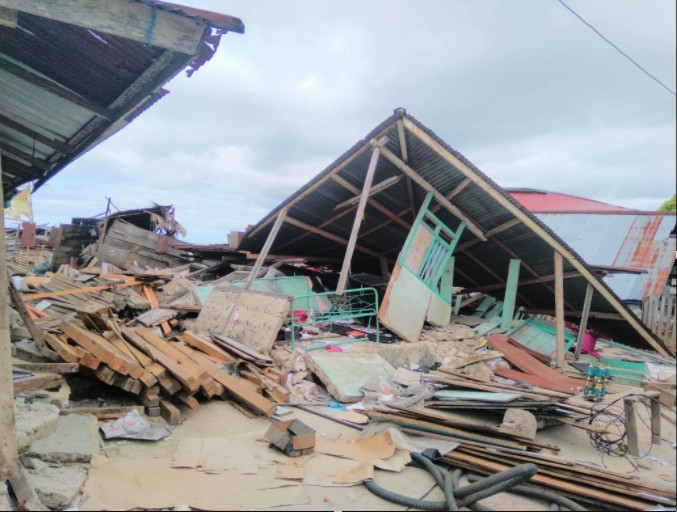
Destroyed house in the aftermath of the earthquake in North Maluku.

Date	Country and location	M_{w}	Depth (km)	MMI	Notes	Casualties	
Date	Country and location	M_{w}	Depth (km)	MMI	Notes	Dead	Injured
1	Vanuatu, Penama offshore, 40 km east northeast of Luganville	6.0	91.0	V	-	-	-
1	Poland, Silesia, near Katowice	2.7	0.7	-	This small earthquake caused a cave-in at Murcki-Staszic mine. Three miners were killed in this incident, and six others seriously injured.	3	6
4	China, Sichuan, 12 km east northeast of Xunchang	5.1	10.0	VI	It was an aftershock of the 5.8 quake on June 17. Additional damage to buildings was caused, and thirteen people suffered injuries.	-	13
4	Canada, British Columbia offshore, 250 km west northwest of Port McNeill	6.2	10.0	IV	-	-	-
4	United States, California, 11 km southwest of Searles Valley	6.4	10.5	VIII	The largest foreshock of the 2019 Ridgecrest earthquakes was felt in Las Vegas and Los Angeles. Structural damage and some fires occurred in Ridgecrest, near the epicenter. Around 20 people sustained light injuries. Later, a man was found dead in Nevada, suspected to have been crushed by his car during the quake.	1	20
5	Poland, Lower Silesia, 6 km west northwest of Rudna	4.6	10.0	VI	Damage was observed in Rudna copper mine. One miner died, trapped in the rubble, and five others were injured.	1	5
6	United States, California, 18 km east of Ridgecrest	7.1	8.0	IX	The mainshock of the 2019 Ridgecrest earthquakes was again felt in Las Vegas and Los Angeles, and as far away as Ensenada, Mexico. Further structural damage and additional fires occurred in Ridgecrest, near the epicenter. Five people were injured.	-	5
7	Indonesia offshore, Molucca Sea, 136 km west southwest of Ternate	6.9	35.0	V	-	-	-
8	Iran, Khuzestan, 31 km southeast of Masjed Soleyman	5.6	19.0	VII	The earthquake caused damage in Khuzestan region, like cracks in walls and fallen roofs. One person died of a heart attack, and around 100 people were slightly injured.	1	100
9	Philippines, Soccsksargen, 8 km west of Dolo	5.6	10.0	VI	The July 2019 Cotabato earthquake damaged structures, including a ceiling, and classes were suspended. Three students were injured after fleeing in panic, and one person also died of a heart attack.	1	3
11	Papua New Guinea, Bougainville offshore, 179 km north northwest of Arawa	6.0	495.2	II	-	-	-
12	Philippines, Caraga, 7 km east of Cantilan	5.8	14.3	VI	The municipality of Madrid was hit with structures/buildings suffering damage, including a restaurant tipped over in Cantilan. 63 people were injured in the quake.	-	63
13	Japan, Ryukyu Islands offshore, 169 km northwest of Naze	6.1	251.0	III	-	-	-
14	Australia, Western Australia offshore, 198 km west of Cable Beach	6.6	10.0	V	It tied the strongest earthquake ever recorded in Australia. Slight damage to buildings was observed in Broome.	-	-
14	Indonesia, North Maluku, 155 km south southeast of Sofifi	7.2	19.0	VI	During the 2019 North Maluku earthquake, severe damage occurred in Halmahera, like collapsed buildings and cracked roads. 14 people died (five of them later in the hospital after being badly injured) and 129 others were injured.	14	129
15	Papua New Guinea, West New Britain, 26 km north northwest of Kandrian	6.3	42.0	VI	-	-	-
16	Indonesia, East Java offshore, 46 km south southeast of Muncar	5.7	80.0	V	Some infrastructure was damaged in Bali and East Java. Seven people were injured, five of them in Bali.	-	7
19	Greece, Attica, 1 km north northeast of Magoula	5.3	10.0	VI	Power outages and some structural failures were observed in the 2019 Athens earthquake. Three people were slightly injured by the rubble.	-	3
23	Antarctica offshore, Balleny Islands region	6.0	10.0	-	-	-	-
25	India, Maharashtra offshore, 25 km southwest of Shirgaon	4.1	10.0	IV	One man was killed when his thatched house fell on him, and his wife injured.	1	1
26	Philippines, Cagayan Valley offshore, 43 km north of Basco	6.0	9.0	VI	During the 2019 Batanes earthquake, many old buildings were damaged in Itbayat, mostly in rural areas. Nine people died and around 60 others were injured.	9	60
27	Japan, Mie offshore, 138 km east southeast of Shingu	6.3	367.0	III	-	-	-
31	Vanuatu, Malampa offshore, 63 km east of Lakatoro	6.6	181.0	IV	-	-	-

=== August ===
August
- Strongest: 6.9 M_{w} Indonesia
- Deadliest: 6.9 M_{w} (Indonesia) Indonesia; 8 deaths
- Total fatalities: 9

Number by magnitude
- 8.0–8.9: 0
- 7.0–7.9: 0
- 6.0–6.9: 9
- 5.0–5.9: 98
- 4.0–4.9: 557

Date	Country and location	M_{w}	Depth (km)	MMI	Notes	Casualties	
Date	Country and location	M_{w}	Depth (km)	MMI	Notes	Dead	Injured
1	Chile, O'Higgins offshore, 96 km southwest of San Antonio	6.8	25.0	VI	Some damage was observed in Viña del Mar, where power was cut.	-	-
2	Southern East Pacific Rise	6.0	10.0	-	-	-	-
2	Indonesia, Banten offshore, 152 km southwest of Labuan	6.9	49.0	VI	After the 2019 Sunda Strait earthquake, a tsunami warning was issued for Sumatra and Java. 139 buildings were damaged and some destroyed, including four mosques. Eight people died and 8 others were slightly injured.	8	8
4	Japan, Fukushima offshore, 61 km east northeast of Namie	6.3	38.0	V	It was likely an aftershock of the 2011 Tōhoku earthquake.	-	-
4	Iran, Kohgiluyeh and Boyer-Ahmad, 25 km north of Dogonbadan	5.4	7.7	VII	Some houses sustained damage in rural areas and five people were injured.	-	5
7	Taiwan, Yilan offshore, 35 km south southeast of Yilan	5.8	20.8	VI	A 60-year-old woman was killed in New Taipei after a closet fell on her during the quake. More than 10,000 houses lost power in Taipei.	1	-
8	Turkey, Denizli, 9 km east southeast of Baklan	5.9	11.0	VI	About 400 houses were damaged and around 80 people were slightly injured.	-	78
13	Peru, Ancash, 12 km west northwest of Ticllos	4.9	14.9	VI	Slight damage to buildings was caused. One old woman was injured by a falling roof in Cajacay.		1
16	United States, Kansas, 3 km west of South Hutchinson	4.2	5.0	VI	Some damage was caused in South Hutchinson, especially in the main street and in some supermarkets.	-	-
20	Solomon Islands, Santa Cruz Islands offshore, 90 km southeast of Lata	6.0	37.0	V	-	-	-
21	Western Indian-Antarctic Ridge	6.0	10.0	II	-	-	-
24	Vanuatu, Torba offshore, 61 km southwest of Sola	6.0	115.0	IV	-	-	-
27	South Georgia and the South Sandwich Islands offshore, 131 km south of Bristol Island	6.6	16.0	IV	-	-	-
29	United States, Oregon offshore, 285 km west of Bandon	6.3	10.0	V	-	-	-
31	Myanmar, Sagaing, 26 km northwest of Shwebo	5.4	10.0	VII	Some pagodas suffered serious damage.	-	-

=== September ===
September
- Strongest: 6.7 M_{w} Chile
- Deadliest: 6.5 M_{w} Indonesia; 41 deaths
- Total fatalities: 85

Number by magnitude
- 8.0–8.9: 0
- 7.0–7.9: 0
- 6.0–6.9: 9
- 5.0–5.9: 134
- 4.0–4.9: 567

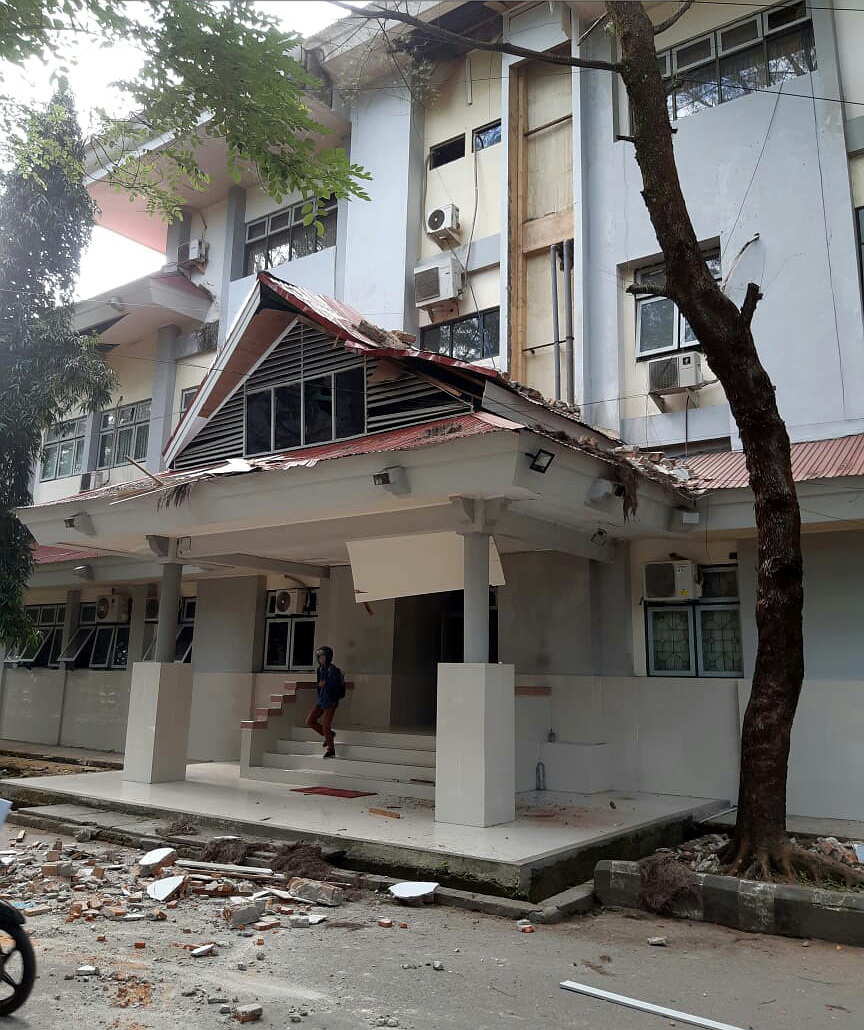
A damaged building in Pattimura University, Ambon after the earthquake in Indonesia.

Date	Country and location	M_{w}	Depth (km)	MMI	Notes	Casualties	
Date	Country and location	M_{w}	Depth (km)	MMI	Notes	Dead	Injured
1	Fiji, Lau offshore, 30 km north northeast of Ndoi Island	6.6	591.0	III	-	-	-
7	China, Sichuan, 14 km west southwest of Neijiang	5.1	10.0	VI	At least 132 houses collapsed and 4,880 were damaged during the earthquake. One person died and 63 others were injured, two of them in a critical condition.	1	63
9	Tanzania, Katavi, 39 km west southwest of Mpanda	5.4	25.0	VI	Some damage was caused in Mpanda district, where various houses collapsed. Two children were injured by a falling wall.	-	2
19	Indonesia, East Java offshore, 81 km north northeast of Lasem	6.1	610.0	I	-	-	-
21	Albania, Durrës, 3 km west southwest of Shijak	5.6	20.0	VII	During the 2019 Shijak earthquake, at least 108 people were injured and more than 120 buildings were damaged in the country's strongest earthquake in 30 years.	-	108
24	United States, Puerto Rico, Aguadilla offshore, 67 km north northwest of San Antonio	6.0	10.0	IV	Minor damage occurred in the western part of Puerto Rico. In Mayagüez, a water pipe broke.	-	-
24	Pakistan, Azad Kashmir, 8 km south southeast of Mirpur	5.4	10.0	VII	In the 2019 Kashmir earthquake, widespread damage was reported from the area near the epicenter. More than 6,000 houses were completely destroyed. 40 people were killed and around 850 were injured.	40	852
24	Southwest Indian Ridge	6.0	10.0	-	-	-	-
25	Indonesia, Maluku offshore, 33 km northeast of Ambon	6.5	12.3	VII	During the 2019 Ambon earthquake more than 6,000 buildings were damaged or destroyed, and landslides were triggered. 41 people were killed, mostly buried by landslides, and more than 1,500 were injured.	41	1,578
26	Pakistan, Azad Kashmir, 15 km northwest of Jhelum	4.7	10.0	V	It was an aftershock of the 2019 Kashmir earthquake. Some additional damage was caused and 75 people were injured.	-	75
26	Turkey, Tekirdağ offshore, 17 km east northeast of Marmara Ereğlisi	5.7	8.0	VI	After the 2019 Istanbul earthquake, minor damage to buildings occurred, including a partial mosque collapse in Avcılar. One person died of a heart attack and 43 people sustained light injuries.	1	43
26	Chile, Los Lagos, 30 km west southwest of Villa La Angostura, Argentina	6.1	129.0	IV	One diver died in Puerto Montt, after a decompression problem caused by the earthquake.	1	-
27	New Zealand, Kermadec Islands offshore, 100 km south of Raoul Island	6.1	34.0	IV	-	-	-
29	Philippines, Davao offshore, 86 km south southeast of Pundaguitan	6.2	73.0	IV	-	-	-
29	Chile, Maule offshore, 70 km west southwest of Constitución	6.7	11.0	VI	No damage was reported, but a 62-year-old woman died in Concepción due to a heart attack.	1	-

=== October ===
October
- Strongest: 6.6 M_{w} Philippines
- Deadliest: 6.6 M_{w} Philippines; 14 deaths
- Total fatalities: 34

Number by magnitude
- 8.0–8.9: 0
- 7.0–7.9: 0
- 6.0–6.9: 5
- 5.0–5.9: 121
- 4.0–4.9: 589

Date	Country and location	M_{w}	Depth (km)	MMI	Notes	Casualties	
Date	Country and location	M_{w}	Depth (km)	MMI	Notes	Dead	Injured
3	India, Manipur, 17 km east northeast of Imphal	4.8	59.2	IV	Two people were seriously injured after a building collapsed in Imphal East District.	-	2
3	Poland, Silesia, 4 km southeast of Paniówki	2.8	5.0	-	This small earthquake caused a mine collapse. One miner died and nine others were injured.	1	9
6	Pakistan, Azad Kashmir, 4 km southwest of Jhelum	3.6	10.0	IV	A house collapsed in Mirpur, killing one person and injuring some others. It was an aftershock of the 2019 Kashmir earthquake.	1	10
10	Indonesia, Maluku, 12 km north northeast of Ambon	5.2	35.0	IV	It was an aftershock of the 2019 Ambon earthquake. Serious damage was caused to a college, one pupil was killed by the rubble, and three others injured.	1	3
16	Philippines, Soccsksargen, 7 km east northeast of Columbio	6.4	16.1	VIII	During the first of the 2019 Cotabato earthquakes, some infrastructure in Soccsksargen and Davao Region suffered damage, including a fire that occurred in General Santos. Around 200 people sustained injuries and 7 others died.	7	215
20	Fiji, Kadavu offshore, 94 km south southwest of Suva	5.7	17.5	V	On Kadavu Island, minor damage and landslides occurred. Cracks in the ground were also observed.	-	-
21	Vanuatu, Tafea offshore, 61 km north northeast of Isangel	6.4	231.0	IV	-	-	-
23	Ascension Island offshore, North Atlantic Ocean	6.3	10.0	II	-	-	-
25	Spain, Andalusia, 2 km east northeast of Olvera	4.4	10.0	IV	Schools were closed, and cracks on walls appeared on various buildings in Olvera.	-	-
27	China, Gansu, 75 km southwest of Linxia City	5.3	10.0	VI	21 people were injured after the quake. 2,097 houses were damaged to varying degrees in the county.	-	21
29	Philippines, Soccsksargen, 10 km northeast of Columbio	6.6	15.0	VII	During the second of the 2019 Cotabato earthquakes, serious damage was caused in Davao and Soccksargen, where some buildings collapsed and many others were damaged. 14 people died, three were missing, and over 500 others were injured.	14	562
31	Philippines, Soccsksargen, 2 km east northeast of Bulatukan	6.5	10.0	VII	During the third of the 2019 Cotabato earthquakes, some buildings in Davao and Soccksargen were seriously damaged and an hotel completely collapsed. 10 more people died and one person was reported missing following a landslide.	10	-

=== November ===
November
- Strongest: 7.1 M_{w} Indonesia
- Deadliest: 6.4 M_{w} Albania; 51 deaths
- Total fatalities: 63

Number by magnitude
- 8.0–8.9: 0
- 7.0–7.9: 1
- 6.0–6.9: 16
- 5.0–5.9: 139
- 4.0–4.9: 647

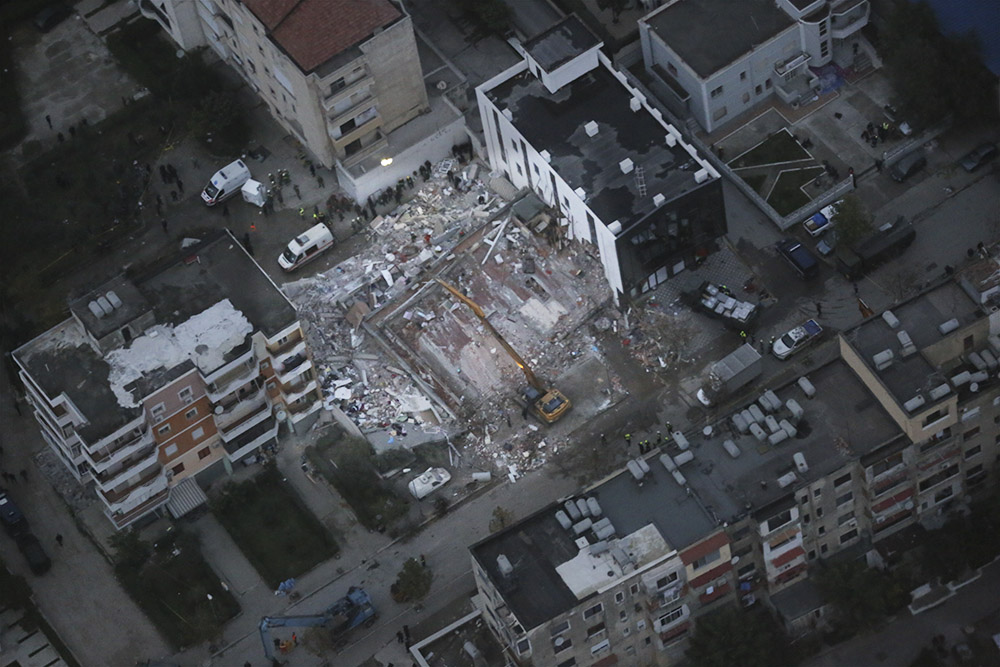
Aerial view of collapsed building in Durrës, Albania.

Date	Country and location	M_{w}	Depth (km)	MMI	Notes	Casualties	
Date	Country and location	M_{w}	Depth (km)	MMI	Notes	Dead	Injured
2	South Georgia and the South Sandwich Islands offshore, 122 km north northeast of Visokoi Island	6.1	8.0	IV	-	-	-
4	Chile, Coquimbo, 29 km southwest of Illapel	6.1	53.0	VI	-	-	-
4	Tonga, Vavaʻu offshore, 136 km west of Neiafu	6.6	10.0	IV	-	-	-
5	South Georgia and the South Sandwich Islands offshore, east of the South Sandwich Islands	6.3	10.0	-	-	-	-
5	Vanuatu, Torba offshore, 23 km east northeast of Sola	6.0	19.0	VI	-	-	-
6	Vanuatu, Torba offshore, 33 km east northeast of Sola	6.0	10.0	VI	It was an aftershock of the 6.0 quake a few minutes earlier.	-	-
7	Italy, Abruzzo, 2 km southwest of Villavallelonga	4.6	10.0	V	Minor damage was caused, such as cracks on walls and plaster, and rockfalls.	-	-
7	Iran, East Azerbaijan, 59 km northeast of Hashtrud	5.9	20.0	VII	Thirty villages near the epicenter were reported destroyed by the 2019 East Azerbaijan earthquake, and damage was caused in many places of East Azerbaijan Province. Seven people were killed and more than 500 injured.	7	584
8	Fiji, Lau offshore, 166 km south southwest of Ndoi Island	6.5	577.0	II	-	-	-
11	France, Auvergne-Rhône-Alpes, 5 km west northwest of Rochemaure	4.8	10.0	VI	At least 825 buildings were damaged, 200 of them severely in Le Teil, including a church. Four people were injured, one of them in a critical condition after falling from scaffolding.	-	4
11	Tonga, Haʻapai offshore, 147 km northwest of Neiafu	6.2	10.0	IV	-	-	-
12	Indonesia, Maluku, 20 km northeast of Ambon	5.0	48.3	IV	It was an aftershock of the 2019 Ambon earthquake. Additional damage was caused, killing two people and injuring 9 others.	2	9
14	Indonesia, Molucca Sea, 141 km northwest of Ternate	7.1	33.0	VI	A tsunami warning was issued, then lifted. 36 buildings were damaged, including three churches and a school. Three people were injured by falling bricks and one person died of a heart attack.	1	3
14	Indonesia, Molucca Sea, 135 km northwest of Ternate	6.0	23.0	V	It was an aftershock of the 7.1 quake a few hours before.	-	-
17	Morocco, Drâa-Tafilalet, 46 km east of Midelt	5.0	10.0	VI	Various houses were damaged in Midelt, but no injuries were reported.	-	-
18	Philippines, Northern Mindanao, 2 km north of Kadingilan	5.9	14.5	VII	Around 300 houses were seriously damaged in Bukidnon province. Sixteen people sustained light injuries and 500 families evacuated.	-	16
20	Mexico, Chiapas offshore, 125 km southwest of Puerto Madero	6.3	15.0	IV	-	-	-
20	Russia, Sea of Okhotsk, 264 km northwest of Ozernovskiy	6.3	496.0	-	-	-	-
20	Laos, Sainyabuli, 43 km west northwest of Sainyabuli	6.2	10.0	VII	Two people were injured and around twenty buildings damaged in Laos. Some damage was also caused in the neighbouring Thailand, in Nan province.	-	2
23	Indonesia, Papua offshore, 241 km southeast of Tobi Village	6.2	5.0	III	-	-	-
24	United States, Alaska offshore, Aleutian Islands, 95 km southeast of Adak	6.3	20.0	IV	-	-	-
25	China, Guangxi, 54 km northeast of Cao Bằng, Vietnam	5.0	10.0	VI	One person was killed in Daxin County in Guangxi Province, China. Several houses were cracked and falling rocks were triggered in Cao Bằng Province, Vietnam.	1	4
26	Albania, Durrës, 15 km west southwest of Mamurras	6.4	22.0	VIII	During the 2019 Albania earthquake, widespread damage was caused in Durrës County, where many buildings collapsed and others were badly damaged, trapping people under the rubble. 51 people died. Around 3,000 people were wounded.	51	3,000
26	Bosnia and Herzegovina, Herzegovina-Neretva, 4 km south southeast of Blagaj, Mostar	5.3	10.0	VIII	Slight damage was caused to some buildings in Mostar, and two people were slightly injured. This tremor occurred only a few hours after the devastating earthquake in nearby Albania.	-	2
27	Greece, Crete offshore, 42 km northwest of Kissamos	6.0	69.0	V	-	-	-

=== December ===
December
- Strongest: 6.8 M_{w} Philippines
- Deadliest: 6.8 M_{w} Philippines; 13 deaths
- Total fatalities: 13

Number by magnitude
- 8.0–8.9: 0
- 7.0–7.9: 0
- 6.0–6.9: 11
- 5.0–5.9: 120
- 4.0–4.9: 616

Date	Country and location	M_{w}	Depth (km)	MMI	Notes	Casualties	
Date	Country and location	M_{w}	Depth (km)	MMI	Notes	Dead	Injured
2	United States, Alaska offshore, Aleutian Islands, 127 km southwest of Adak	6.0	28.0	IV	It was an aftershock of the 6.3 quake on November 24.	-	-
3	Chile, Arica y Parinacota offshore, 29 km west of Arica	6.0	38.0	V	-	-	-
4	Vanuatu, Tafea offshore, 60 km north northeast of Isangel	6.0	266.0	III	-	-	-
6	Tonga, Vavaʻu offshore, 159 km west northwest of Hihifo	6.0	10.0	IV	-	-	-
9	Italy, Tuscany, 2 km north of San Piero a Sieve	4.6	10.0	V	Some old buildings and a church were damaged in Barberino di Mugello, trains were also disrupted.	-	-
15	Philippines, Davao, 7 km south of Magsaysay	6.8	18.0	VII	During the 2019 Davao del Sur earthquake, 4,545 houses, 9 public buildings and 20 other buildings were destroyed, including a supermarket building in Padada, trapping vendors and customers under the rubble. 13 people died, one remains missing and 210 others were injured.	13	210
18	China, Sichuan, 10 km west northwest of Neijiang	4.9	10.0	VI	At least 780 houses were damaged or collapsed, and power was cut in over 11,968 households. 18 people were injured, including four in critical condition.	-	18
20	Afghanistan, Badakhshan, 49 km southwest of Jurm	6.1	212.0	IV	A 4-year-old boy was injured when a boundary wall collapsed in Khyber Pakhtunkhwa, Pakistan.	-	1
23	Canada, Vancouver Island offshore, 201 km west of Port McNeill	6.0	10.0	IV	It was a foreshock of the 6.3 quake on December 25.	-	-
23	Canada, Vancouver Island offshore, 189 km west of Port McNeill	6.0	10.0	IV	It was a foreshock of the 6.3 quake on December 25.	-	-
24	Argentina, Santiago del Estero, 16 km west northwest of El Hoyo	6.0	572.4	II	-	-	-
24	Colombia, Meta, 1 km north northeast of Lejanías	6.0	11.0	VII	Fifteen houses were damaged in Lejanías, and roads were blocked by landslides.	-	-
25	Canada, Vancouver Island offshore, 203 km west of Port McNeill	6.3	6.6	IV	-	-	-
26	China, Hubei, 11 km west of Chengzhong	5.0	10.0	IV	Seven houses collapsed and 673 were damaged in Hubei. One person suffered a broken leg.	-	1
27	Iran, Bushehr, 47 km southeast of Borazjan	4.8	10.0	V	Minor damage was caused to houses, with one house suffering wall collapse. Rockfalls also blocked a road.	-	-
29	United States, Guánica, Puerto Rico offshore, 10 km south southeast of Guánica	5.0	6.0	V	Slight damage was observed, as well as cracks in walls and fallen objects in supermarkets. It was a foreshock of the 6.4 quake on January 7, 2020.	-	-

== See also ==
- Lists of earthquakes
- Lists of 21st-century earthquakes
- Lists of earthquakes by year
