= Gong County =

Gong County may refer to:

- Gong County, Sichuan, county in Yibin, Sichuan, China
- Gong County, Henan, former name of Gongyi, city in Henan, China
