= 2019 Sichuan earthquake =

5.8 Mw earthquake in Sichuan, China

- Location within Sichuan
- UTC time: 2019-06-17 14:55:45
- ISC event: 615956027
- USGS-ANSS: ComCat
- Local date: 17 June 2019
- Local time: 22:55
- Magnitude: 5.8 M_{w}
- Depth: 6 km (4 mi)
- Epicenter: 28.405°N 104.957°E
- Type: Oblique slip
- Areas affected: Sichuan, Chongqing
- Total damage: 5.62 billion yuan (US$812 million)
- Max. intensity: MMI VIII (Severe)
- Aftershocks: 7
- Casualties: 13 dead, >200 injured

An earthquake measuring 5.8 M_{w} struck the province of Sichuan in China at 22:55 local time (14:55 UTC), 17 June 2019. Changning and Gong counties in Yibin were particularly affected. 13 people died and more than 200 others were injured.

== Tectonic setting ==
Sichuan lies within the zone of complex tectonics caused by the continuing convergence of the Indian plate with the Eurasian plate. The active faulting in this area relates to the eastward movement of material away from the Tibetan Plateau, which has been uplifted by this collision. The largest structure in the area is the Longmenshan Fault, movement on which was responsible for the M7.9 2008 Sichuan earthquake.

== Earthquake ==
Modified Mercalli intensities in selected locations
| MMI | Locations | Population exposure |
| MMI VIII (Severe) | Changning | 57,000 |
| MMI VII (Very strong) | Changning, Gong | 319,000 |
| MMI VI (Strong) | Gao, Xingwen | 794,000 |
| MMI V (Moderate) | Yibin | 3.55 million |
| MMI IV (Light) | Zigong, Luzhou | 24.9 million |

Based on the focal mechanism the earthquake was a result of oblique-slip faulting, dominantly reverse faulting with a component of strike-slip. Further analysis suggests that the initial movement was on a reverse fault followed by rupture along a shallow strike-slip fault. The reverse fault movement matches well with the known stress field in the area, but the strike-slip fault is less favourably orientated, suggesting the presence of elevated pore pressures due to water injection associated with solution mining of rock salt. Results from the analysis of Interferometric synthetic-aperture radar (InSAR) data indicate that the reverse fault was shallow enough to be intersected by the openhole sections of some of the injection wells.

A number of aftershocks also occurred.

| Magnitude | Location | Time (UTC) | Depth |
|---|---|---|---|
| 5.8 | 19 km S of Changning, China | 2019-06-17 14:55:45 | 6.0 km |
| 5.2 | 15 km SSW of Changning, China | 2019-06-17 15:36:02 | 10.0 km |
| 4.7 | 8 km SSE of Changning, China | 2019-06-17 16:29:08 | 10.0 km |
| 4.9 | 14 km SSE of Changning, China | 2019-06-17 16:37:56 | 10.0 km |
| 4.9 | 12 km S of Changning, China | 2019-06-17 21:03:26 | 10.0 km |
| 5.2 | 20 km SSE of Changning, China | 2019-06-17 23:34:34 | 10.0 km |
| 5.3 | 13 km S of Changning, China | 2019-06-22 14:29:55 | 10.0 km |
| 4.9 | 7 km SSE of Changning, China | 2019-06-23 00:28:18 | 10.0 km |

== Damage ==
More than 20,000 houses were badly damaged and some roads, communication infrastructure and hydroelectric power plants were also reported to be affected.

There were 13 deaths overall, 9 of them in Changning County and the other 5 in Gongxian County. A further 220 people were reported injured, 6 of them critically and 16 severely. Total damage was estimated at CN¥ 5.62 billion (US$812 million).

== See also ==
- List of earthquakes in 2019
- List of earthquakes in China
  - List of earthquakes in Sichuan
