= 2019 Athens earthquake =

2019 earthquake in Greece

- Location within Greece
- UTC time: 2019-07-19 11:13:15
- ISC event: 616066960
- USGS-ANSS: ComCat
- Local date: July 19, 2019
- Local time: 14:13
- Magnitude: 5.3 M_{w}
- Depth: 10.0 km (6.2 mi)
- Epicenter: 38.095°N 23.525°E
- Areas affected: Athens, Greece
- Max. intensity: MMI VI (Strong)
- Casualties: 3 injured

An earthquake occurred at 2:13 p.m. on Friday, July 19, 2019, and affected many people in the middle of the day. Several seismological institutes determined a magnitude of about 5.3 and the epicentral region appeared to be south of Mt Parnitha, ~20 km NW of the Athens metropolitan area. Nearly 20 years before, on the 7th September 1999, Athens was struck by a 6.0 magnitude earthquake.

The earthquake engendered power cuts and communication problems for at least two hours around Athens and the emergency responders reported receiving calls about people being trapped in elevators. Three people were injured.

== Setting ==
Greece is located in the South-East of Europe and is characterized by a complex tectonic structure, with major mountain ranges and a high seismic activity, concentrated in the Hellenic Arc.

There is historical evidence of several earthquakes located at distances between 30 and 70 km outside the city of Athens.

== Macroseismicity and vulnerability ==
To determine the perceived intensity of the 2019 earthquake, the Macroseismic Field Investigation Team of the Department of Geology and Geoenvironment of the University of Athens (NKUA), surveyed citizens from the suburbs of Athens and several towns near the epicentre within a few hours after the earthquake and in the following week. They could gather 63 questionnaire which reported the felt shaking based on the EMS-98 intensity scale and 48 damage photos.

== Data from the EMSC ==
The EMSC is among the international seismological institutes that use citizens' perceived shaking to determine an estimate of the felt intensity of the earthquake. The EMSC surveys people who just experienced an earthquake through a set of cartoons depicting the 12 levels of the EMS-98 intensity scale. This procedure is very fast and is essential to rapid situational awareness.

In the case of the 2019 Athens earthquake, 76% of felt reports received by the EMSC were gathered within the first hour following the earthquake onset, allowing for a quasi real-time information. Most responses came from Attica.

== See also ==
- List of earthquakes in 2019
- List of earthquakes in Greece
