= 2019 Ambon earthquake =

Earthquake affecting Maluku, Indonesia

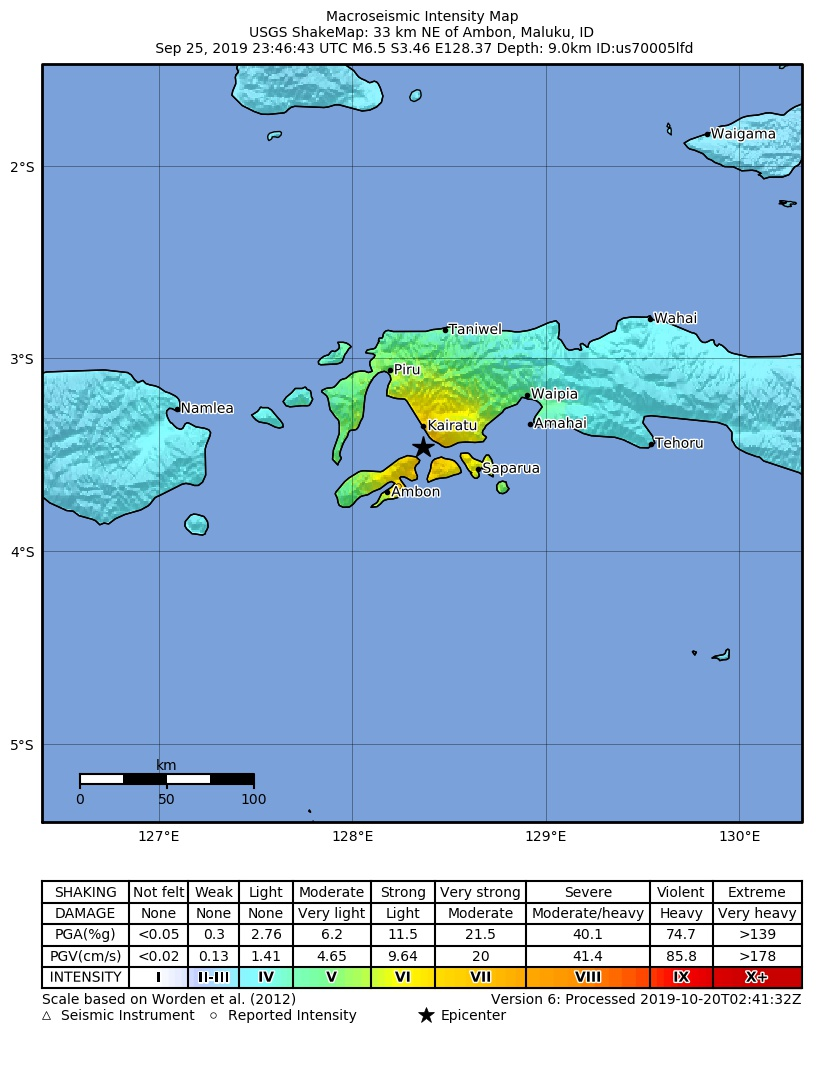

- Location within Indonesia
- UTC time: 2019-09-25 23:46:44
- ISC event: 616504279
- USGS-ANSS: ComCat
- Local date: 2019-09-26
- Local time: 07:46:44 WIT
- Magnitude: M_{w} 6.5
- Depth: 12.3 km (8 mi)
- Epicenter: 3.450°S 128.347°E
- Fault: Kawa Strike-slip fault
- Type: Strike-slip fault
- Areas affected: Maluku, Indonesia
- Max. intensity: MMI VII (Very strong)
- Landslides: Yes
- Aftershocks: ±1,105 (as of 6 October)
- Casualties: 41 dead, 1,578 injured

On 26 September 2019, a strong magnitude 6.5 earthquake struck Seram Island in Maluku, Indonesia, near the provincial capital of Ambon. The earthquake struck at 07:46:44 Eastern Indonesia Time (23:46:44 on 25 September UTC) with a shallow depth of 18 km. The tremor could be felt throughout the island, with an intensity of very strong (VII) reportedly felt in the provincial capital of Ambon.

In the aftermath of the quake, severe damage was reported throughout the island. More than 6,000 structures were damaged or destroyed throughout Maluku. A total of 41 people were killed by the quake and another 1,578 people were injured. More than 150,000 people evacuated and set makeshift camps due to aftershocks and fear of building collapse. As of 6 October, more than a week after the earthquake, approximately 1,105 aftershocks had been recorded by local geological stations in Maluku.

== Earthquake ==
According to the Indonesian Meteorology, Climatology, and Geophysical Agency (BMKG), the earthquake's epicenter was located inland of Seram Island, some 42 kilometres (26 mi) northeast of the city of Ambon, the capital of Maluku and 10 km from the town of Kairatu. BMKG reported a magnitude of M_{w} 6.8, while the United States Geological Survey (USGS) reported a M_{w} 6.5 earthquake. It struck at 23:46:44 UTC, with a depth of 18.2 kilometres (11.3 mi) according to the USGS. BMKG later revised the magnitude of the earthquake to M_{w} 6.5. The agency reported that the earthquake was caused by a strike slip fault mechanism.

Indonesian National Earthquake Centre reported that the fault that was responsible for the quake hadn't been previously mapped by scientists. They stated that the fault had "shifted" due to deformation on the fault. The fault, however, was not considered as a new fault. The Indonesian Institute of Sciences stated that energy released by the earthquake was equivalent to that released in the 1945 nuclear bombing of Hiroshima.

Strong shaking were felt in the provincial capital of Ambon and in several other regencies in Maluku. Following the earthquake, roads were jammed with vehicles as mass panic occurred throughout Ambon. Panicked residents of Ambon had attempted to rush to higher ground due to tsunami fears, though BMKG stated that there was no risk of a tsunami. Several people were injured in the chaos and a woman was reportedly killed after she fell from her motorcycle during the evacuation. Road accidents reportedly occurred due to the mass panic. A man was apprehended by police for yelling "tsunami" out loud in the midst of a crowd of evacuees.

The Indonesian BMKG disclosed the information of the intensity of the earthquake felt by the resident in Maluku, with an intensity of V (Moderate) in the provincial capital of Ambon and II (Weak) in Banda Islands. The USGS, however, reported intensity (Very strong) in Ambon and the surrounding area.

=== Aftershocks ===
By morning of 27 September, BMKG reported that they have detected 239 aftershocks. On 6 October, the agency reported that more than 1,000 aftershocks had been recorded, of which the strongest was a magnitude 5.6, which struck Ambon at a depth of 10 km, less than an hour after the mainshock.

On 11 October, a 5.2 magnitude earthquake struck Ambon at a depth of 10 km. The quake struck with a strike-slip mechanism, with its epicenter located offshore, approximately 16 km east of the city. The powerful quake managed to damage several buildings in Ambon. Several buildings including a music shop and an ICU suffered significant damage and a high school reportedly collapsed, killing a student. A government-owned office building also reportedly collapsed due to the aftershock. A total of 8 people were injured in the aftershock. Due to the powerful aftershock, shops were closed and dozens of people evacuated.

== Damage ==
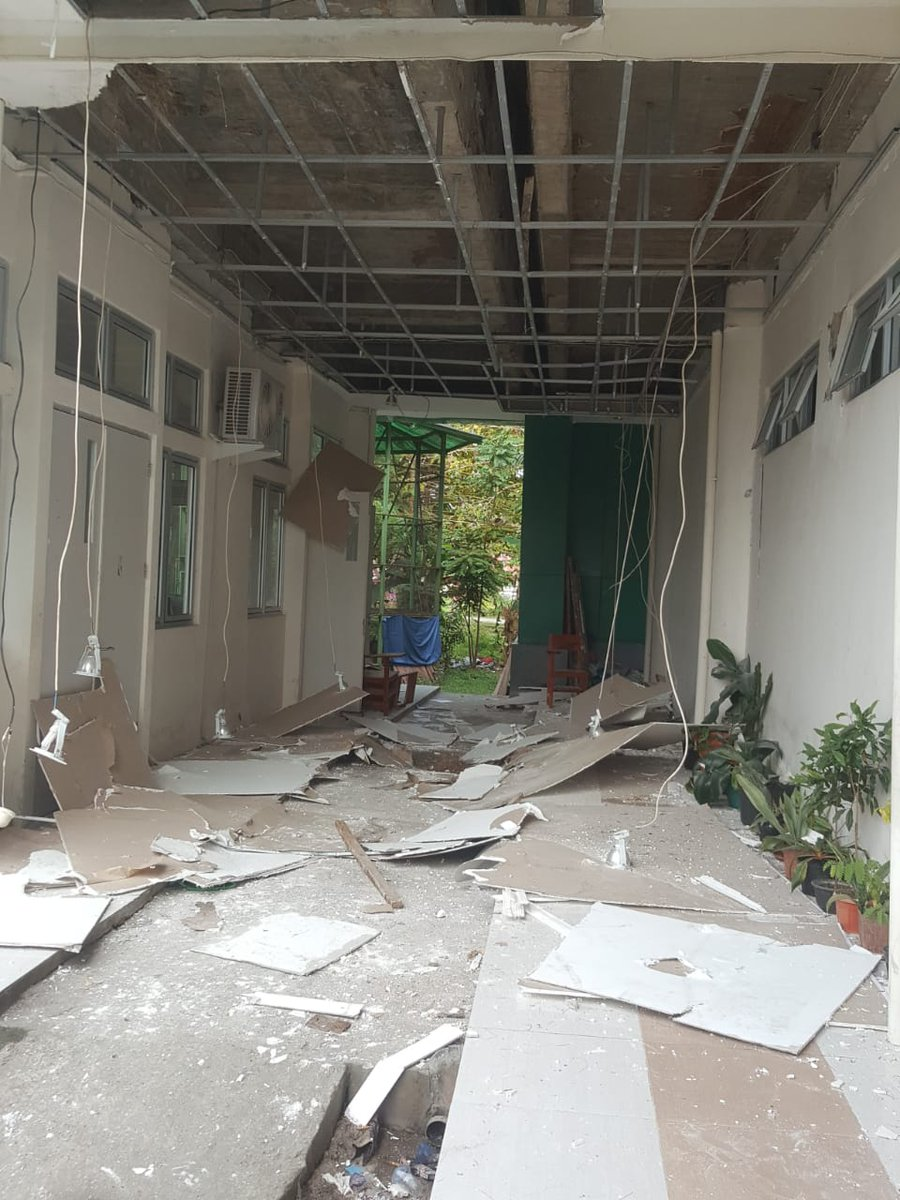
A damaged hallway in Pattimura University, Ambon

In the immediate aftermath of the earthquake, significant damage was reported in the provincial capital Ambon. Ambon's iconic Merah Putih Bridge, then the longest bridge in Eastern Indonesia, suffered cracks on its expansion joint. Buildings in Pattimura University, Ambon's oldest university, suffered cracks on the walls and caved ceilings. State Islamic University of Ambon reported cracks and wall collapse. The university's auditorium and library were also damaged in the quake. A lecturer and a student were injured and taken to the hospital, while another lecturer and another student were reportedly killed due to fallen debris. A major fire was also reported in a neighborhood in Ambon. Malls and public institutions reported slight damage. Places of worship such as churches and mosques also reportedly suffered slight damage

In Tulehu, a floating market collapsed onto the sea due to the shaking. Patients in Tulehu Hospital were evacuated to Darussalam University due to the damage in the hospital. In Central Maluku Regency, the main hospital, dr. H. Ishak Umarella Regional Hospital, suffered significant damage. Fearing that the hospital might collapse, emergency tents were set up outside of the hospital, with patients treated outside. Hundreds of houses were severely damaged in Central Maluku Regency. At least 4 villages reported moderate to heavy damage to many homes and structures in the villages.

Soil liquefaction was reported in a village in Ambon, with mud and "coral" spewing out from the ground. There were also reports on multiple sand boil in the village. Rockfalls and landslides were also reported in the region. At least one person was killed after a landslide struck an elementary school in Ambon. Another 8 people were killed after a mine collapse onto miners in Ambon.

Ambon's local disaster mitigation agency reported 25,000 people in temporary shelters following the earthquake, with 224 houses reported damaged. On 3 October, the figure rose to 6,000 damaged houses, of which nearly 2,000 were severely damaged or destroyed. Further examination revealed that more than 6,700 structures across the region were damaged or destroyed in the quake. Preliminary report showed that a total of 21 schools were damaged in Ambon. As of 9 October, at least 172 schools and campus were damaged, most of which reportedly suffered moderate damage.

== Casualties ==
By the evening of 27 September, local time, 23 fatalities had been confirmed from the earthquake, primarily due to falling rubble from damaged buildings. Over a hundred people were reportedly wounded. A majority of the casualties occurred in the Central Maluku Regency, where 14 deaths were reported.

On 29 September 2019, seven other people were found dead or had succumbed to their injuries, bringing the death toll to 30. Four more deaths were announced on September 30. The death toll rose to 36 on October 2 and 38 on October 4. On October 8, at least 39 people were declared dead, with 1,578 reported injuries. 41 deaths were finally reported on October 18.

== Response ==
President of Indonesia Joko Widodo expressed his condolences for the earthquake, and stated that affected victims would have their medical fees covered by the government. At least 2,000 emergency packages were sent to Maluku. The Indonesian National Board for Disaster Management released Rp 1 billion (c. USD 70,000) in immediate funding and Rp 515 million in logistical support. The Ministry of Social Affairs released a further Rp 1.1 billion in funds, later announced that those who had relatives killed by the quake would be compensated with a total of Rp15 million rupiah. The Indonesian Ministry of Public Works and Public Housing provided sanitation and gallons of drinkable water to Maluku. The Ministry announced that "habitable houses" will be built in Maluku to those who had lost their homes in the quake. Approximately 3,000 houses will be built across 11 cities and regencies in Maluku.

Immediately after the disaster, the provincial government of Maluku declared a state of emergency for 14 days. It later made a plea to Jakarta to help with the rehabilitation process. Four days after the earthquake, Ambon local government declared a disaster declaration for 2 weeks. On 9 October, due to the increasing number of evacuee, the provincial government of Maluku extended the state of emergency to an unspecified time amount. The local government of Ambon, however, stated that they would not extend the state of emergency, effectively ending the state of emergency period in Ambon on 9 October.

Due to the "unusual" number and "aggressiveness" of earthquakes and aftershocks in the region, the Indonesian National Disaster Mitigation Agency announced that it would conduct a joint study with experts from Bandung Institute of Technology (ITB) on the seismic zone and the fault mechanism in the area. Consequently, a total of 11 seismographs were installed in the region. The study later proposed an earthquake-proof structural design for educational institutions in Indonesia. The agency also announced that a total of Rp 2 billion rupiah of emergency funds would be provided to ease the relief efforts in Maluku. It also provided economic relief programs to the evacuees.

The Indonesian National Police sent logistics and essential supplies to the evacuees. The Regional Police of Maluku provided trauma healing and counseling to treat PTSD, with check-ups routinely held every day.

Multiple political parties, community organisations and universities also sent aids to Maluku. Perempuan Bangsa (Nation's Women), which is under the affiliation of Indonesian National Awakening Party, assisted with emotional counseling for the affected. National Democrat Party (Nasdem) sent a team of medical health professionals to Maluku. Government-owned health insurance company BPJS and major aid organisation Rumah Zakat sent hundreds of logistics to Maluku. Meanwhile, University of Indonesia sent the local government of Ambon an Earthquake Warning Alert System (EWAS). Fundraisers were also set up by youth organisations in the country.

Moluccan community in Waalwijk, Netherlands made a plea to the local government to send aid to Ambon. The majority of the council members overwhelmingly accepted the motion. Ex-senator from Netherlands' GroenLinks Party Samuel Richard Pormes stated that he hoped for the willingness of the Indonesian National Disaster Mitigation Agency to cooperate for the aids distribution.

There were many complaints from evacuees that they had not received aids, donations and logistics from the government. Maluku's government admitted that relief effort and aids delivery were hampered due to the inaccessibility of some villages in the region. They later added that there was a shortage of blankets, tarps and tents in some evacuation centres.

On 29 October, 9 days after his second inauguration, Indonesian President Joko Widodo visited several evacuation centres in Maluku to check with the evacuees. He stated that the government would send more aids and emergency funds and that houses that had been either damaged or destroyed would be rebuilt or repaired. A total compensation of Rp50 million would be handed to those who had their houses heavily damaged by the quake, while a total of Rp25 million and Rp10 million would be handed to those with moderate and slight damage, respectively. He later promised that the aid funds would be available for the evacuees in 6 months.

== See also ==
- List of earthquakes in 2019
- List of earthquakes in Indonesia
