= 2019 Sunda Strait earthquake =

2 August 2019, earthquake in Indonesia

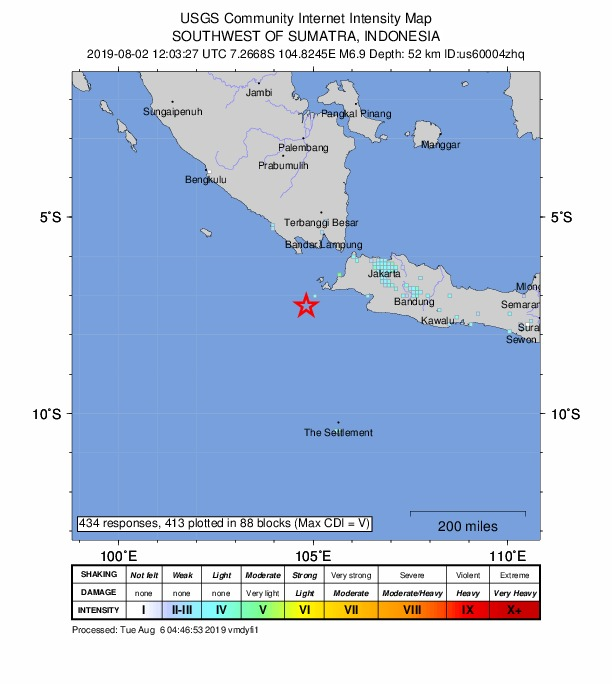
- Intensity map of the earthquake
- UTC time: 2019-08-02 12:03:27
- ISC event: 616193491
- USGS-ANSS: ComCat
- Local date: 2 August 2019
- Local time: 19:03:27 WIB (Indonesia Western Standard Time)
- Duration: 10–20 seconds
- Magnitude: 6.9 M_{w}
- Depth: 52.8 km (33 mi)
- Epicenter: 7°32′24″S 104°34′48″E
- Fault: Unknown, near Sunda megathrust
- Type: Oblique-slip
- Areas affected: Banten, West Java, Jakarta
- Max. intensity: MMI VI (Strong)
- Casualties: 8 dead, 8 injured, 33 displaced

The 2019 Sunda Strait earthquake occurred on the night of 2 August 2019, when a magnitude 6.9 earthquake rattled Sunda Strait at a moderate depth of 52.8 kilometres. The epicentre was located 214 km from Bandar Lampung, the capital of Lampung and 147 km west of Sumur, Pandeglang Regency. The earthquake struck with a maximum intensity of VI (Strong). The earthquake prompted a tsunami warning in the area, with authorities urging coastal residents to immediately evacuate to higher grounds.

The earthquake was the largest earthquake to have hit Jakarta and West Java since 2009, when a magnitude 7.0 struck Java killing 81 people. In the aftermath, the earthquake damaged a total of 505 structures across Banten and West Java. The earthquake caused 8 deaths, 8 injuries and displaced a total of 33 people. All of the deaths were indirectly caused by the earthquake.

== Earthquake ==
The earthquake struck at 19:03 local time (12:03 UTC) at a moderate depth of 52.8 km (Indonesian BMKG stated that the earthquake struck at a depth of 10 km). The epicentre was located 147 km off the coast of Sumur, an area which had been previously destroyed by another tsunami in December 2018. Indonesian geological agency BMKG recorded the magnitude of the earthquake as 7.4 while the USGS recorded it as a magnitude 6.9 earthquake. BMKG subsequently revised the magnitude to 6.9 and its hypocentre to 48 km.

The earthquake struck with an oblique-slip motion. According to experts from the Indonesian BMKG, the earthquake wasn't caused by Sunda megathrust, but rather from a nearby fault, indicated by its north–south motion of the rupture. It was later confirmed that the earthquake was an intraplate earthquake.

=== Intensity ===
Moderate shaking were widely reported across Lampung, Banten and West Java. In Jakarta, office workers and apartment residents were evacuated from high rise buildings, citing "strong shaking". The operation of Jakarta MRT was terminated due to the earthquake. The earthquake could be felt as far away as Mataram, which was located in Lombok Island. In Yogyakarta, residents reported "swaying motion" from the earthquake. The recorded maximum Mercalli-intensity of the earthquake was VI (strong). The maximum perceived intensity, however, was V (moderate).

=== Tsunami ===
A tsunami warning was issued for Lampung and Banten, with an expected maximum height of 3 m. Residents in coastal areas, especially those in Southern Lampung and Pandeglang Regency, were urged by authorities to evacuate to higher grounds. In Lampung, at least 1,050 people evacuated to the governor's office. Initially, there were unconfirmed reports that water levels had receded in several areas in Banten. These reports were considered as hoaxes as observation of tide gauges showed that there were no observed changes in water levels around Banten and Lampung. Nearly one and a half-hour after the warning was issued, it was cancelled by Indonesian BMKG.

== Casualties ==
On 3 August, the Indonesian Government confirmed that 2 people had died during the evacuation, one of whom reportedly died due to heart attack. On 4 August, the death toll later rose to 5 and then stood at 6, specifically 1 in Pandeglang Regency, 3 in Lebak Regency and 2 in Sukabumi Regency. All of the deaths were indirectly caused by the earthquake and none were caused by fallen debris. Additionally, 3 injuries were reported and 33 people were displaced by the earthquake. Finally, on 5 August, a number of eight casualties was confirmed.

== Damage ==
Since most of the buildings located in the region are vulnerable and don't meet with the current criteria for an earthquake-resistant building, significant damage was widely reported across the region. Most of the buildings in the region are considered as unreinforced masonry building. Preliminary reports showed that dozens of structures across Banten and West Java had been either damaged or destroyed by the earthquake. On 3 August, hours after the quake, reports indicated that 21 houses and 1 mosque had been damaged. The number later rose to 200. Cracks were found in several homes in Bandung, the capital of West Java. A total of 7 homes were damaged in Bogor. Pandeglang Regional Disaster Management Board stated that 42 homes were damaged in Pandeglang, particularly in Mandalawangi. A total of 505 structures, including schools, mosques and public institution, were damaged in the quake. Traditional Baduy settlements with vernacular buildings reported little to no damage A campus in Jakarta was damaged.

The Indonesian Ministry of Public Works and Public Housing, however, stated that no infrastructures had been damaged in the quake.

== Response ==
The Indonesian Ministry of Health stated that the Central Government's medical department will not help with the handling of the healthcare for the survivors, stating that the regional government is 'adequate enough' to handle. The Ministry of Social Affairs stated that it had dispatched personnel of Tagana (Taruna Siaga Bencana) to the affected areas. The ministry stated that those who perished in the quake would be compensated with Rp 15 million each.

== See also ==
- List of earthquakes in 2019
- List of earthquakes in Indonesia
- 1999 Sunda Strait earthquake
