= 2021 Northern Peru earthquake =

2021 earthquake in Peru

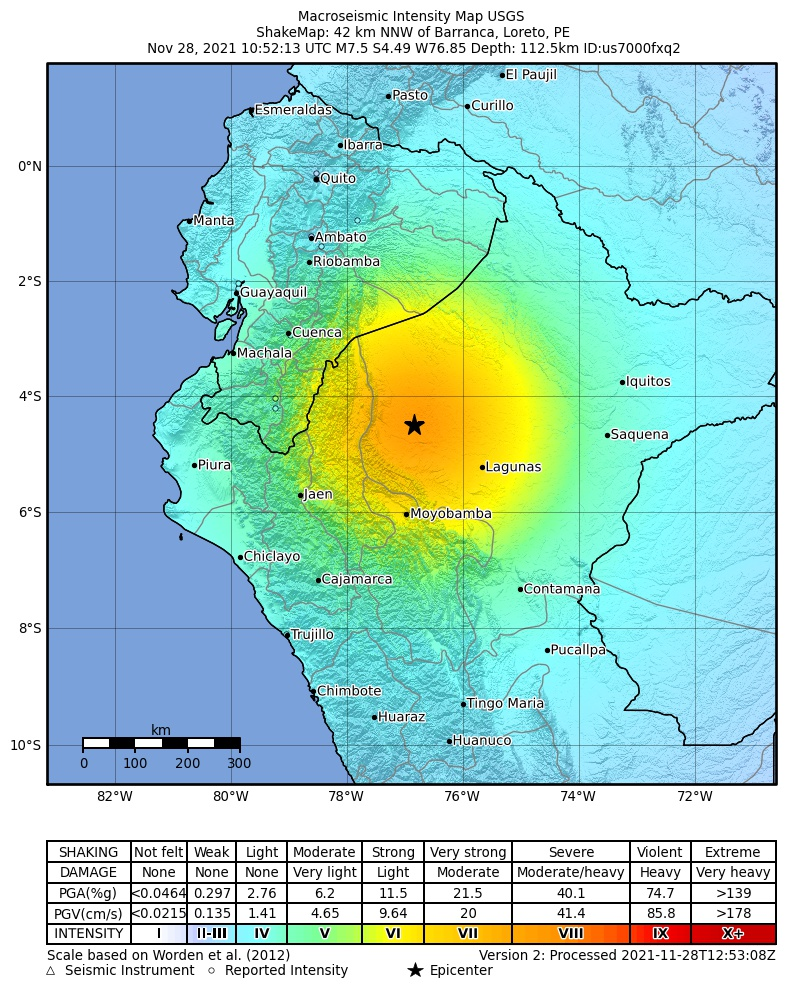

- Location within Peru
- UTC time: 2021-11-28 10:52:13
- ISC event: 621480794
- USGS-ANSS: ComCat
- Local date: November 28, 2021
- Local time: 05:52:13 UTC-5
- Magnitude: 7.5 M_{w} 7.6 M_{wpd}
- Depth: 112.5 km (69.9 mi)
- Epicenter: 4.490°S 76.846°W
- Type: Normal fault
- Areas affected: Peru, Ecuador
- Max. intensity: MMI VII (Very strong)
- Casualties: 12 dead (11 indirect), 136 injured, 1 missing

A major earthquake struck northern Peru on November 28, 2021, 5:52 a.m. local time with a magnitude of 7.5 on the moment magnitude scale between the Amazonas and Loreto departments of Peru. A maximum Modified Mercalli intensity (MMI) of VII (Very Strong) was reported in the town of Santa Maria de Nieva according to the Geological Institute of Peru.

Serious damage occurred in Peru, and some damage was reported in Ecuador. One person died of a heart attack, another from falling wood, and 126 others were injured. Ten additional deaths occurred the following day when a bus crashed on the damaged Fernando Belaunde Terry Highway.

== Tectonic setting ==
Peru lies above the convergent plate boundary where the Nazca Plate is subducting beneath the South American Plate, along the line of the Peru–Chile Trench. In northern Peru the rate of convergence between the plates is about 70 mm/yr. Almost all of the seismicity that affects western South America is a result of this ongoing subduction, either directly or indirectly. Earthquakes occur on the megathrust interface between the two plates, or within either the subducting or over-riding plates. At this latitude, the Nazca plate is seismically active to depths of about 650 km. This earthquake occurred in a segment of the subducted plate that has produced frequent intermediate-depth earthquakes with focal depths of 100 to 150 km, such as the 2005 and 2019 Peru earthquakes.

== Earthquake ==
The earthquake had a preliminary magnitudes of 7.4 however upgraded to 7.5 by the United States Geological Survey. The hypocentral depth was at 112.5 km (69.9 mi). The earthquake was felt throughout northern Peru and was also strongly felt in Ecuador. The shock was a result of normal faulting within the descending Nazca Plate, according to the Geophysics Institute of Peru and U.S. Geological Survey. Two similarly sized normal-faulting earthquakes struck the Peruvian Amazon in 2005 and 2019. The 2019 earthquake was located in the same department and measured 8.0 magnitude, killing at least two people. Such earthquakes are known as intermediate-depth events due to their depth of focus. Earthquakes of these types occur within the subducted slab rather than at the plate boundary, known as intraslab earthquakes.

=== Other events ===
Earlier in that day, Lima was struck by a magnitude 5.1 quake offshore at 64.5 km depth. That event occurred due to convergence along the Peru-Chile subduction zone at the plate boundary, hence are unrelated.

On February 3, 2022, a magnitude 6.5 earthquake struck the same region. This earthquake may have been an aftershock, as it occurred 6 km (3.7 mi) north of the mainshock. It also had a maximum MMI of VI (Strong). No casualties were reported, but eighty houses and eight public buildings were damaged in the Barranca District, while two buildings suffered minor damage in Zamora-Chinchipe Province, Ecuador.

== Impact ==
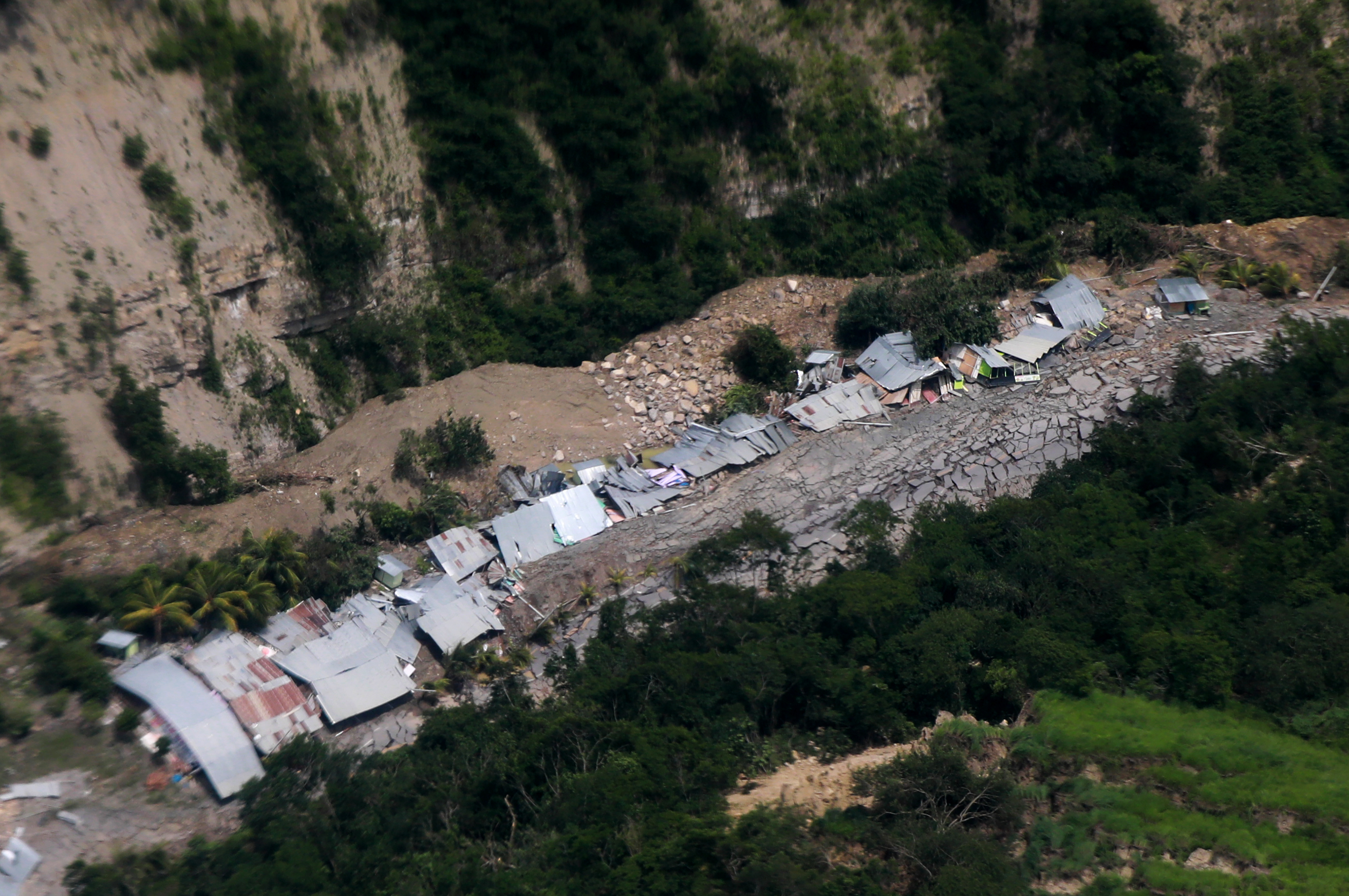
Collapsed houses in Utcubamba Province

A total of 4,189 people were displaced due to the earthquake. Some 4,429 homes were damaged, including 1,976 totally destroyed. Seven churches also collapsed. The National Institute of Civil Defence of Peru confirmed one fatality and at least 126 injuries. The fatality was caused by a heart attack. A second fatality was reported on 29 November. The three-year-old child was killed by falling wood in Bongará Province. An elderly person is also missing.

In the Valera District, at least 30 residents were affected. Another 12 people became homeless in the Cajaruro District. In the provinces of Alto Amazonas and Chachapoyas Provinces, 35 people were affected. The Fernando Belaúnde Terry highway was partially buried by a landslide. Three people were injured in the La Jalca District, and 70% of the homes were damaged, according to the district's mayor. Many of the homes damaged were constructed of mud and stone. Thirteen schools in the Amazonas, Loreto, and Piura departments were damaged. Many of the schools suffered cracks and collapsed walls. Doors and windows were knocked down. Cracks in the ceiling and floor were also reported.

A 14-meter (46 ft) tower in a protected four-century-old church collapsed shortly after the earthquake, according to local media and witness accounts. Video footage showed the historic tower, part of a 16th-century complex that was considered the oldest Catholic church in the Amazonas region, reduced to a pile of stones, although the main atrium appeared to be still standing. Several buildings, including another church were damaged in neighbouring Ecuador.

Ecuadorian authorities reported some buildings were damaged in the Saraguro Canton of Loja Province. Collapsed masonry, a church, and one house was documented. A house and education facility also collapsed in Centinela del Cóndor Canton. In the Chordeleg Canton, an old concrete building was destroyed. Road damage was reported in Cuenca Canton, caused by a rockslide.

On the Fernando Belaunde Terry highway near the epicenter, ten people died and seven were injured when a minibus drove off a cliff and plunged 300 meters down a valley. The accident occurred in Bongará Province between the cities Chachapoyas and Moyobamba along the highway.

== Response ==
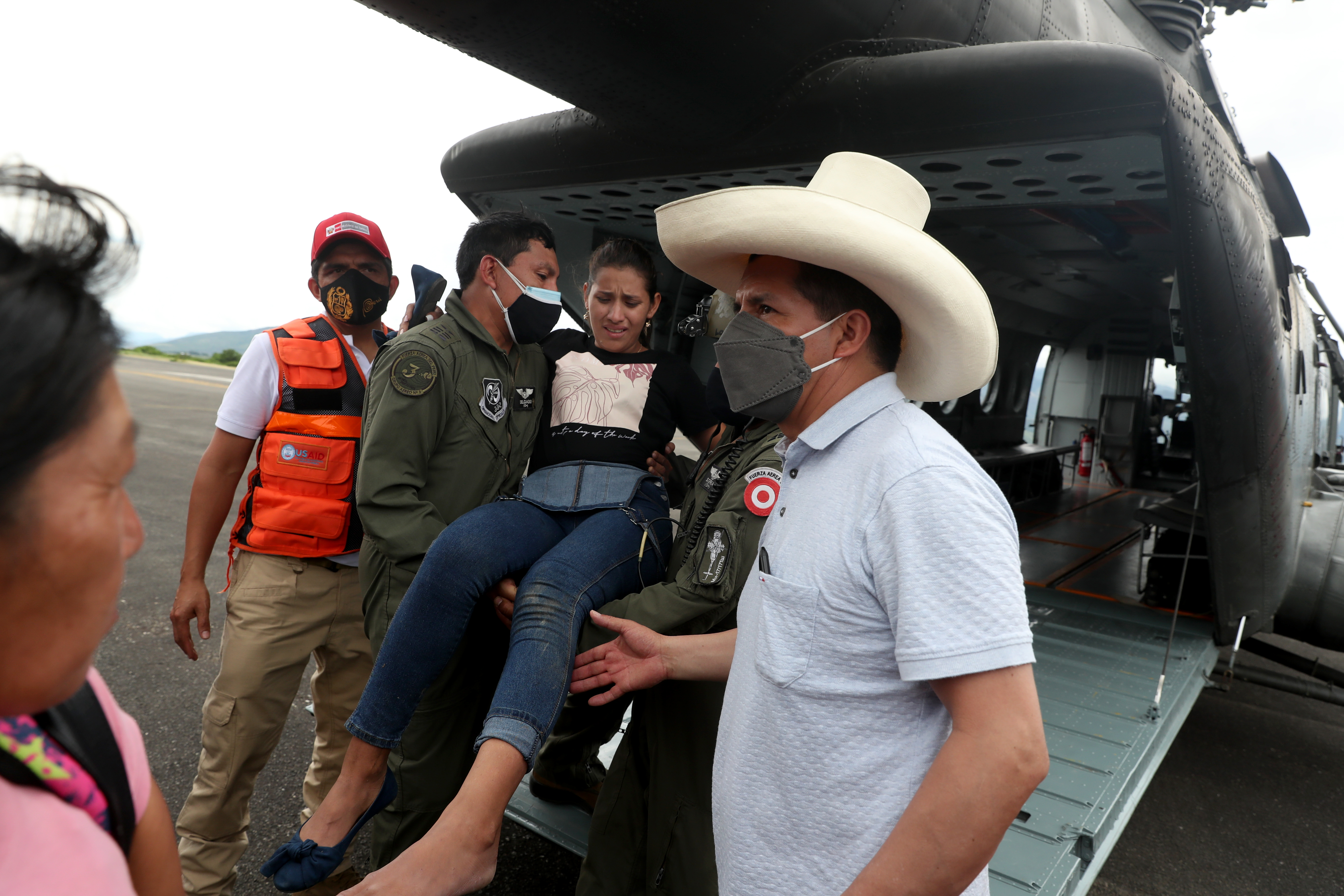
President Pedro Castillo visited areas affected by the earthquake

The Prime Minister of Peru, Mirtha Vásquez, announced that her government is considering declaring a state of emergency in some of the affected regions. President Pedro Castillo immediately visited the affected area in the aftermath.

A village near the Utcubamba River has been evacuated after an overflowing risk was found. The water level in the river rose higher after a landslide dammed the river channel.

== See also ==
- List of earthquakes in 2021
- List of earthquakes in Peru
