= 2005 Northern Peru earthquake =

- UTC time: 2005-09-26 01:55:37
- ISC event: 7951634
- USGS-ANSS: ComCat
- Local date: September 25, 2005
- Local time: 20:55:37 PET (UTC-5)
- Duration: 50 seconds
- Magnitude: 7.5 M_{w} 7.0 M_{L}
- Depth: 115.0 km (71 mi)
- Epicenter: 5.678°S 76.398°W
- Type: Normal
- Areas affected: northern Peru
- Max. intensity: MMI VI (Strong)
- Casualties: 20 dead, 266 injured

At 20:55 PET (01:55 UTC on September 26) on 25 September 2005, an earthquake measuring M_{w} 7.5 or M_{L} 7.0 struck the Department of Loreto in Peru, resulting in 20 fatalities and 266 injuries, with 1,316 homes damaged or destroyed, mostly in the town of Lamas. It had a maximum perceived intensity of VI (Strong) on the Modified Mercalli Intensity Scale.

== Tectonic setting ==
A 7,000 km (4,300 mi) convergent boundary lies off the coast of Peru, where the oceanic Nazca plate subducts or dives beneath the continental South American plate. The Peru–Chile Trench marks the location where the two plates meet and converge. The rate of subduction at this boundary varies throughout its length; from 65 mm (2.6 in) per in the north, to 80 mm (3.1 in) per year in the south. The presence of active subduction produces large earthquakes when elastic energy along the plate boundary (megathrust) is released suddenly after decades or centuries of accumulated strain. Earthquakes rupturing the megathrust are known as megathrust earthquakes; capable of generating tsunamis when there is sufficient and sudden uplift of the seafloor, leading to the sudden displacement of the seawater.

Shallow inland crustal earthquakes within the overriding South American plate are caused by internal deformation of the crust within the Andes Mountains; formed by the ongoing convergence. It has been suggested that a large décollement beneath the range is the source of these earthquakes. The fold and thrust belt systems along the eastern foothills of the Andes are seismically active and produce thrust mechanism earthquakes. Normal and strike-slip mechanism earthquakes also occur within the shallow crust. Flat slab subduction beneath the Peruvian Andes also results in deformation of the South American plate, contributing to this occurrence. Earthquakes with similar magnitudes and mechanisms occurred close to the 2005 event in 1990, 1991, 2019 and 2021.

== Earthquake ==
The epicenter was located in the Department of Loreto, about 39 km (24 mi) northwest of Yurimaguas. Focal mechanism solutions indicate that rupture occurred on either a north or south-striking, moderately dipping normal fault. Of these two possible fault orientations, finite fault modeling of globally recorded seismic data from the United States Geological Survey is more consistent with slip on the north-striking fault; the fault modeling also suggests up to 6.4404 m (21.130 ft) of slip near the epicenter. With its hypocenter located roughly 115 km (71 mi) below the surface within the subducted lithosphere of the Nazca plate, the quake extended itself below the Andes and was felt in a large area, including the Peruvian coastal regions and as far away as Bogotá, Colombia, as well as most of Ecuador and western Brazil. It was the strongest earthquake to hit Peru since 2001.

== Impact ==
At least 20 people died, 266 others were injured and 39,000 residents were displaced, with the earthquake destroying or severely damaging 830 homes and leaving 486 others with minor damage, with most of the affected structures having been built with adobe. In Lamas, 3,000 people were left homeless after the earthquake destroyed 102 houses and severely damaged 498 more, with the town recording five deaths and 60 injuries. Additionally, one woman was killed by a collapsing house in La Libertad, and one more death occurred in San Martín Province. In Moyobamba, the walls of some buildings collapsed. Damage and power outages also occurred in Iquitos, Cajamarca, Chiclayo, Chimbote, Huacho, Tumbes, Sullana, Piura and Pucallpa.

== Response ==
Shortly after the earthquake, ten Red Cross volunteers from Moyobamba visited Lamas to assist affected people. Even with difficult weather conditions in the area, the Red Cross provided the National Institute of Civil Defence with 1,000 blankets, 50 tents and 200 packs containing clothes.

== See also ==
- List of earthquakes in 2005
- List of earthquakes in Peru
