= 2019 North Maluku earthquake =

July 14, 2019, earthquake in Indonesia

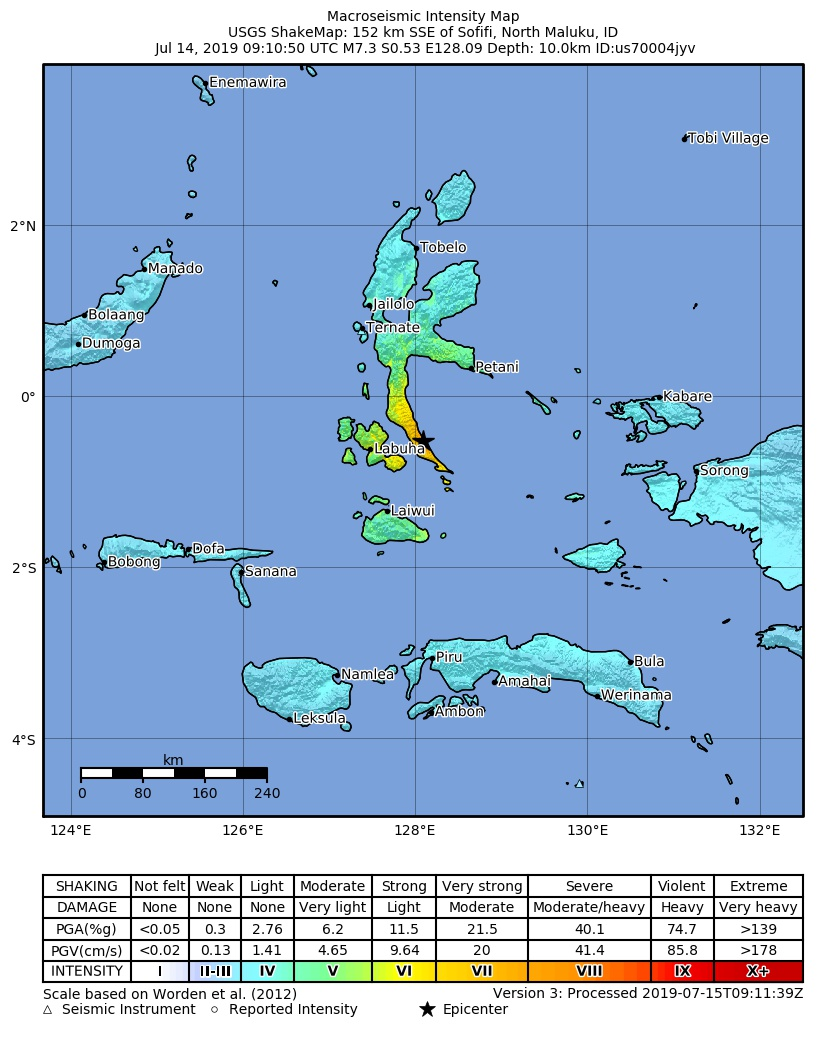
- ShakeMap of the earthquake

- Location within Indonesia
- UTC time: 2019-07-14 09:10:50
- ISC event: 616062317
- USGS-ANSS: ComCat
- Local date: July 14, 2019
- Local time: 18:10:50 WIT (Indonesia Eastern Standard Time)
- Magnitude: 7.2 M_{w}
- Depth: 20 km (12 mi)
- Epicenter: 0.566°S 128.056°E
- Fault: Sorong–Bacan fault
- Type: Strike-slip
- Areas affected: Halmahera, Indonesia
- Max. intensity: MMI VI (Strong)
- Tsunami: Yes (20 cm)
- Aftershocks: 103 (as of July 18)
- Casualties: 14 dead, 129 injured, +50,000 displaced

The 2019 North Maluku earthquake, a shallow 7.2 magnitude earthquake, struck the island of Halmahera, North Maluku, Indonesia on July 14, 2019, at 18:10 local time with its epicentre located at South Halmahera. It struck at a shallow depth of 10 km (6.2 mi) near Labuha, a small port town located in Bacan Island. The earthquake produced a non-destructive 20 cm tsunami, which struck Labuha just minutes after the shaking started. 14 people were killed by the earthquake while 129 people were injured, and more than 50,000 people were displaced. The earthquake inflicted a total damage of Rp 238 billion (US$16 million).

== Tectonic setting ==
Halmahera lies within a zone of complex tectonics caused by the interaction between the Pacific, Australian, Sunda and Philippine Sea plates. The area is further subdivided into microplates, such as the Molucca Sea plate and the Bird's Head plate. The Sorong Fault Zone, is a major strike-slip fault that extends from the Bird's Head peninsula in the east to Sulawesi in the west. Some of the faults that form part of this zone pass through southern Halmahera and the neighbouring Bacan Islands.

== Earthquake ==
The earthquake struck on Sunday afternoon, at 18:10 local time at a shallow depth of 10 km. The Indonesian Meteorological, Climatology, and Geophysical Agency stated that the earthquake had a strike-slip mechanism, meaning that the motion of the rupture was horizontal rather than vertical. The epicentre is located 63 km off-shore Labuha, a small port town in Bacan Island, whereas the USGS gave an epicenter onshore southern Halmahera. The largest peak acceleration was recorded in Labuha seismological station.

=== Intensity ===
Officials stated that 18 accelerographs in Indonesia recorded the shaking, with the furthest located in Sidrap, South Sulawesi, approximately 980 kilometers from the epicentre. Strong shaking were widely reported near the epicentre, with the strongest reportedly felt in Central Bitung District, South Bitung and North Bitung District. The thick and soft sediment soil around the epicentre supposedly amplified the shaking, causing a more severe and stronger shaking. The earthquake could be felt as far away as Gorontalo in Sulawesi and Sorong in West Papua. The earthquake could also be felt in Ambon, the provincial capital of Maluku.

=== Tsunami ===
Tsunami warnings were not issued by the Indonesian Meteorology, Climatology, and Geophysical Agency for the surrounding areas. However, a 20-cm (non-destructive) tsunami was observed by tide gauge in South Halmahera.

== Casualties ==
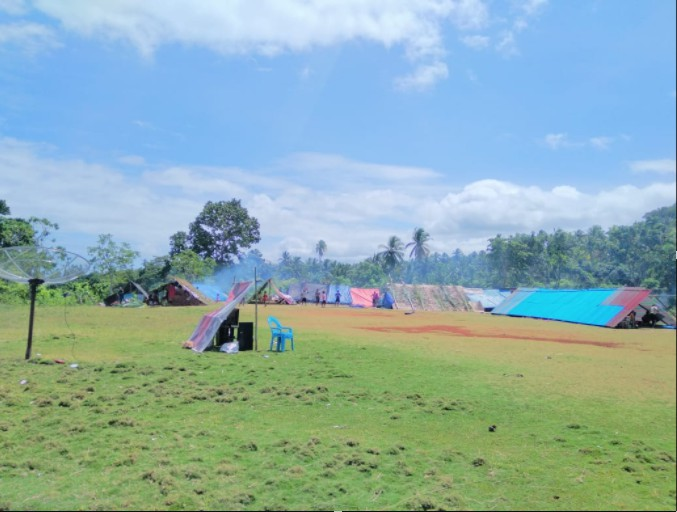
Dozens of camps were set up across North Maluku after the earthquake struck

The strong shaking caused fear of tsunami among residents in North Maluku, even though the Indonesian geological agency stated that no tsunami threat was caused by the earthquake. In Ternate, hundreds of people evacuated to higher grounds due to fear of tsunami. Some evacuated to Ternate's Regional Disaster Management Board. In Labuha, thousands of residents who lived near the coastline evacuated to higher grounds. Some residents elected to evacuate to the mayor's house. Residents from at least 73 villages and 11 districts were displaced by the earthquake.

Preliminary reports indicated that at least 4 people were killed, mostly by fallen debris, while 57 people were injured. At least 3,000 people were displaced by the earthquake. On July 20, officials confirmed that the death toll has risen to 8 while a total of 129 people had been injured by the earthquake. Authorities confirmed that at least 50,000 people had been displaced by the earthquake. On July 24, it was reported that a total of 12 people had been killed by the earthquake. The number of deaths rose to 13 on July 27, then 14 on July 31. The government revealed that 4 people were killed due to fallen debris, while the other 9 died in the camps due to illness.

More than 15 camps had been set up for the survivors of the earthquake. Reports began to emerge that survivors of the earthquake became infected with diseases. Authorities confirmed a total of 117 cases of upper respiratory tract infection and 43 cases of dermatitis. In total, 844 people in the camps had fallen ill. South Halmahera's Department of Health had sent 300 medical staffs to the camps.

== Damage ==
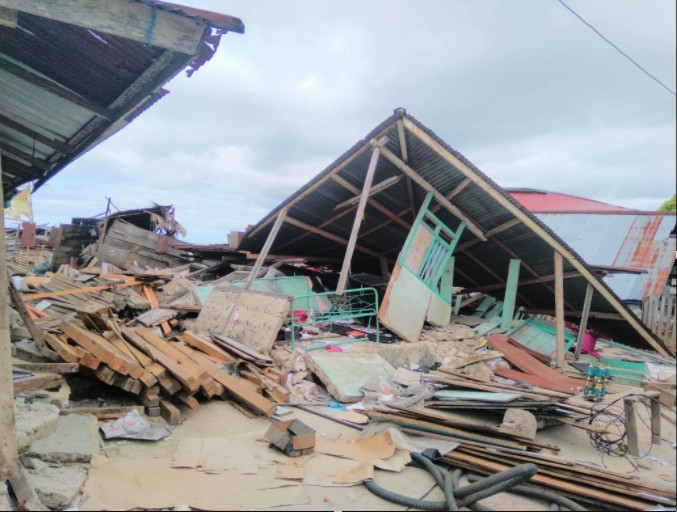
Thousands of homes and structures were heavily damaged during the earthquake

Preliminary assessment conducted by the government of North Maluku showed that more than 980 structures had either been heavily damaged or destroyed. Many houses located near the epicentre had been heavily damaged by the quake. In Yomen Village in Joronga Island, one of the hardest hit areas, all of the residents' 164 houses and a mosque were flattened by the quake, forcing its 686 residents to evacuate to the mountain. As many as 19 elementary schools and 7 junior high schools were damaged. Widespread damage were reported across 21 villages and 5 districts in South Halmahera. At least 110 public facilities were damaged, 78 of which were heavily damaged. Updated reports on the damage assessment revealed that more than 2,700 houses had been damaged or destroyed by the quake, of which 1,500 homes suffered slight damage while the other 1,200 suffered heavy damage.

Labuha's Babang Harbour, the main and crucial harbour in Labuha, was damaged in the quake. The harbour, however, was not closed and transport services were not affected.

Following the earthquake, electrical problems such as blackouts and short circuits were immediately reported across South Halmahera. Officials from the Government-owned electrical company (PLN) stated that several power plants suffered some damage in the quake. 6 days after the earthquake, officials announced that approximately 99% of electricity had been restored to the affected areas. Villages couldn't be accessed by authorities as road access were blocked due to fallen debris, hampering the search and rescue effort. Calculations conducted by the Indonesian National Board for Disaster Management estimated that a total damage of Rp 87 billion (US$6 million) had been inflicted. Updated calculation revealed that the quake inflicted a total of Rp 238 billion (US$16 million) in damage.

== Response ==
The government of North Maluku declared a state of emergency for 7 days, starting from July 15 to 21. It was later extended for another 7 days. North Maluku's government sent tents and basic needs to the affected residents. The local transportation department sent 13 tonnes of logistics to the camps. A total of 500 "impromptu toilets" were also built around the camps.

The vice regent of South Halmahera, Iswan Hasjim, stated that the government would build temporary shelters for the affected residents. A total of Rp 40 billion (approximately US$2 million) would be needed.

The city of Tidore announced that it would send a truck carrying 3 tonnes of foods and basic needs to South Halmahera. Several volunteers were also dispatched by Tidore's local government.

Ministry of Social Affairs sent a total donation of Rp 139 billion, which was sent to 9 villages in Halmahera. The ministry stated that those who died in the quake would be compensated with Rp 15 million each. Ministry of Public Works and Public Housing sent necessities such as tents and water tanks, adding that the ministry would provide basic sanitation to the survivors. The Indonesian BNPB coordinated with Indonesian e-commerce company Bukalapak to ease the delivery of aids. BNPB stated that a total of 100 sembako would be distributed to the camps. Meanwhile, Indonesian National Armed Forces dispatched a ship carrying dozens of personnel, including 2 doctors and 8 medical staffs, and aids such as drugs and logistics to Labuha. A boat clinic was also dispatched from Ambon, Maluku.

Multiple state-owned enterprises sent aids and donations to the affected areas. The state-owned electrical company PLN sent 5 generators and aids worth of Rp 648 million to 30 villages and 7 districts in the affected areas. The state-owned BRI bank, in coordination with South Halmahera's government and another state-owned enterprises Antam, sent Rp 250 million of donations and aids to the affected residents. State-owned petrol company Pertamina sent gasoline, logistics and other essential needs to Labuha.

Private and local organisations also contributed with the recovery efforts. In Makassar, at least 13 local organisations conducted fundraising across the city. In Manado, 3 local organisations also conducted a public fundraising in several spots in the city. Youth organisations also held public fundraising in Ketapang and Sampit. Islamic relief organisations such as Hidayatullah, Dompet Dhuafa, ACT and Al-Imdaad Foundation (which was based in South Africa) sent volunteers, donations and aids to the affected areas.

A football player from Borneo FC, Ambrizal Umanailo, announced that he would hold an auction for his jersey. A total of Rp 4 million was collected from the auction. The football club announced that the money would be donated to the affected residents.

== See also ==
- List of earthquakes in 2019
- List of earthquakes in Indonesia
