= Chang Xiangyu =

Chinese opera actress

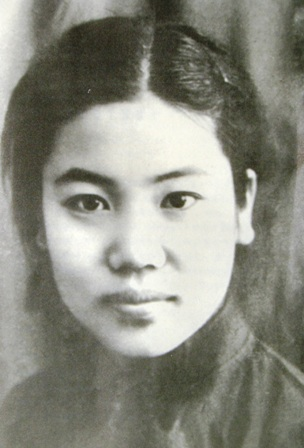
- Chang in 1938
- Born: 15 September 1923; Gongxian County, Henan, China
- Died: 1 June 2004 (aged 80)
- Occupations: Singer, actress

Chang Xiangyu (Chinese: 常香玉; pinyin: cháng xiāng yù) was a Chinese opera actress who performed renditions of the story of Hua Mulan across China in support of the Korean War and who appeared in a 1956 screen adaptation.

== Biography ==
Chang was born in 1923 into a poor farming family in Gongxian County, Henan. From an early age she was taught how to sing and perform Yu opera by her father Zhang Fuxian who feared she may become a child bride. At aged thirteen she appeared in a performance of the Chinese classic Romance of the Western Chamber (西廂記) were afterwards she was given the title Queen of Yuju Opera. In 1944 she married a school headmaster, Chang Xianzhang who retired to help Chang in her career and to establish a school teaching Yu opera. The school which was called the Xiang Yu Opera Troupe opened in 1948 in the capital of Shaanxi Xi'an.

On the outbreak of the Korean War, Chang took part in live action performances of Mulan across China to raise funds for a military plane. Along with other opera troops she eventually raised 1.52 billion yuan, enough for one plane. By 1956 the Chinese Communist Party had banned all American films from being imported into China and nationalized the country's film studios so as to produce films with pro-party messages. To tout their gender egalitarian policies, a film about Mulan was made with Chang cast in the lead role.

Later Chang got into politics and was elected to the National People's Congress attending the first three session and then the fifth sixth and seventh. In 1995 she was awarded National Advanced Worker award for her contributions.

== Filmography ==
Year	Film	Role	Ref.
1965	人欢马叫	Wú dà niáng (吴大娘)	
1956	Hua Mulan	Mulan	
