= 2019 Peru earthquake =

Earthquake in the Department of Loreto, Peru

- Location within Peru Location within South America
- UTC time: 2019-05-26 07:41:14
- ISC event: 615748456
- USGS-ANSS: ComCat
- Local date: May 26, 2019
- Local time: 02:41:12
- Duration: 60 seconds
- Magnitude: 8.0 M_{ww}
- Depth: 122.8 km (76.3 mi)
- Epicenter: 5.796°S 75.298°W
- Type: Dip-slip (normal)
- Areas affected: Peru; Ecuador
- Max. intensity: MMI VII (Very strong)
- Casualties: 2 dead, 30 injured

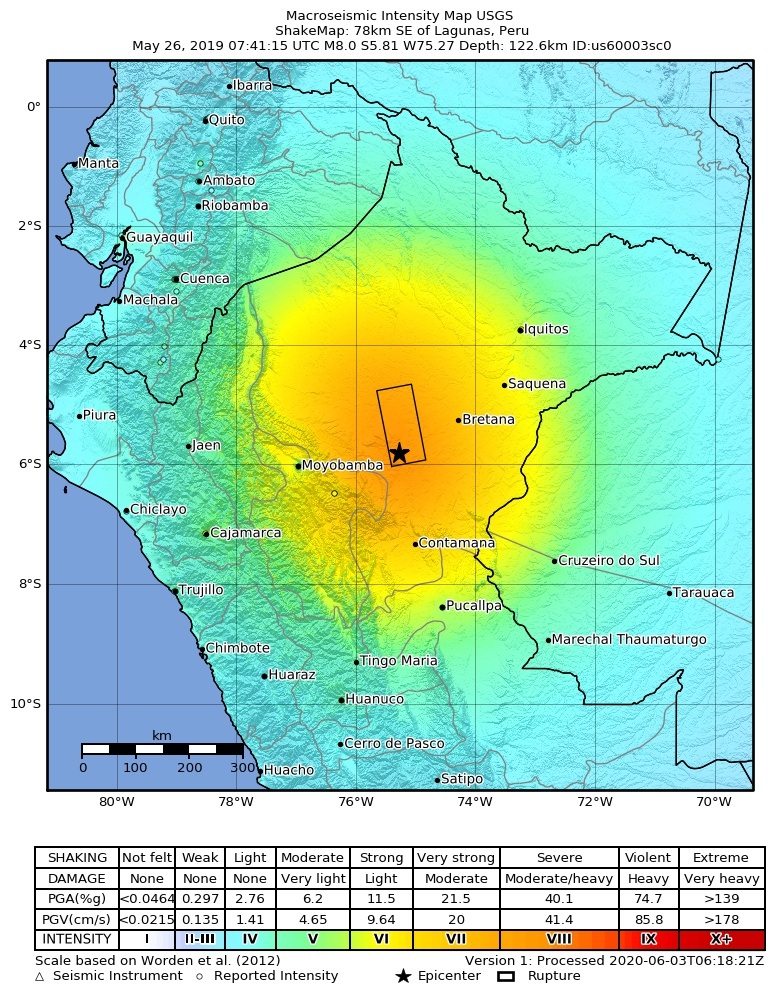

An earthquake measuring M_{w} 8.0 struck Peru and the surrounding areas on 26 May 2019 at 02:41 local time. It had a maximum perceived intensity of VII (Very strong) on the Modified Mercalli intensity scale in the towns of Yurimaguas and Lagunas. Two people died and a further 30 were injured. It was the strongest earthquake in 2019 by magnitude.

== Tectonic setting ==
Peru lies above the destructive plate boundary where the Nazca plate subducts beneath the South American plate. The plates converge at a rate of 70 mm per year. The country has been affected by many large megathrust earthquakes caused by slip along the plate interface, such as the 1868 Arica earthquake. There are also large earthquakes of intermediate depth caused by faulting within the downgoing Nazca plate.

== Earthquake ==
The earthquake lasted for about 60 seconds, with most of the energy being released within a period of about 40–60 seconds. The earthquake's epicenter was in the northern region of Peru, near Ecuador. This intermediate depth event (122.8 km) was caused by normal faulting within the Nazca plate. Out of the two possible solutions of the moment tensor, analysis of seismic waveforms suggests that the causative fault dips towards the east.

The earthquake occurred in a region of the Nazca plate where it transits from flat slab subduction to steep subduction. At this location, the plate bends to a steeper angle. An analysis of the event indicate rupture along a fault that measured 205 km by 105 km with an average rupture propagation velocity of 2.5 km/s. The rupture generated a maximum slip of 6.7 meters at the northern part of the rupture area. Two episodes of seismic energy release occurred within a span of 115 seconds. InSAR data showed that the quake produced 47 cm of subsidence at the surface of the earth, north of the epicenter.

== Damage and casualties ==
Two people were killed and 15 others were injured in Peru, while a further 15 people were injured in Ecuador.

=== Peru ===
The President of Peru, Martín Vizcarra, called for calm and said that he, along with his transportation minister, would evaluate the damage to roadways. Vizcarra also stated that other officials would evaluate damage to structures and any effects on a nearby reservoir. Many people evacuated homes and stores when the earthquake struck late at night. Some buildings, streets, and bridges suffered damage from the earthquake.

The earthquake damaged 833 homes and left 404 of them uninhabitable. 38 health facilities were damaged, with 4 of them being rendered unusable. 111 schools were affected with 7 being put out of action.

=== Ecuador ===
Some damage was reported from the parts of Ecuador closest to the epicenter.

== See also ==
- 1958 Ecuador–Colombia earthquake
- 2005 Northern Peru earthquake
- 2021 Northern Peru earthquake
- List of earthquakes in 2019
