= 2019 Coquimbo earthquake =

Earthquake in Chile

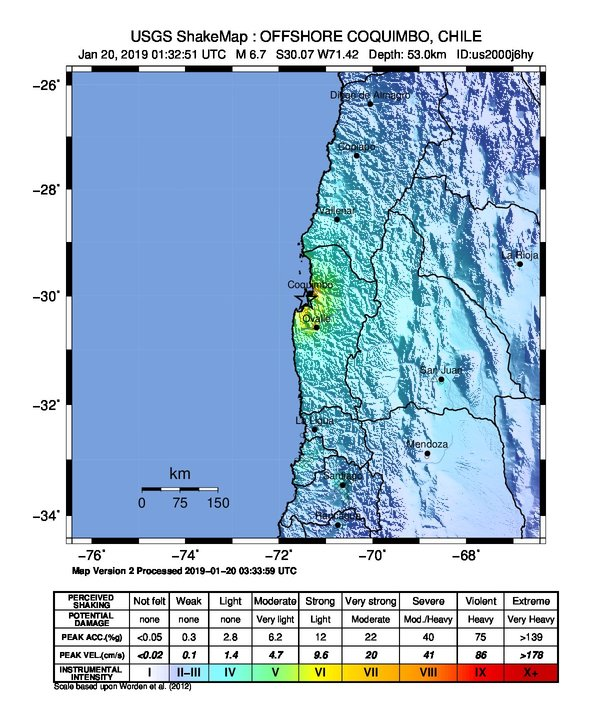

- Location within Chile
- UTC time: 2019-01-20 01:32:52
- ISC event: 614617823
- USGS-ANSS: ComCat
- Local date: January 19, 2019
- Local time: 22:32 CLST (UTC-3)
- Magnitude: 6.7 M_{w}
- Depth: 63.0 km (39.1 mi) (USGS) 50.1 km (31.1 mi)(CSN)
- Epicenter: 30.040°S 71.382°W
- Areas affected: Chile
- Max. intensity: MMI VIII (Severe)
- Aftershocks: >60, largest is mb^{(USGS)} 5.1
- Casualties: 2 dead

The 2019 Coquimbo earthquake occurred 10 km south southwest of Coquimbo in Chile, on January 19, 2019 at 22:32 (local time). The epicenter was located off the coast of the Coquimbo Region at a depth of 63.0 km,) and had a moment magnitude of 6.7. On the Mercalli scale, the earthquake reached an intensity of VIII.

== Tectonic setting ==
Chile lies above the convergent plate boundary where the Nazca Plate is subducting beneath the South American Plate, at a location where they converge at a rate of seventy millimeters a year. This quake was an oceanic interplate type, occurred in the downgoing slab of the Nazca Plate and not on the interface between the two plates. This event took place under the area of Chile, between 27° and 33° S, where the slab is nearly horizontal and there is a high degree of mechanical coupling between the plates.

== Damage and casualties ==
One hundred and eighty houses collapsed and moderate damage occurred in almost 500 structures in the historic center of Coquimbo and La Serena. Cracks were reported in several houses, and some walls partially collapsed. The Our Lady of Mercy Cathedral in La Serena also suffered minor damage. Two people died of heart attacks. Power outages affected more than 200,000 households in the cities of Limari, La Serena, and Coquimbo.

Modified Mercalli intensities in selected locations
MMI	Locations
MMI VIII (Severe)	Coquimbo, La Serena
MMI VII (Very strong)	Andacollo, Vicuña
MMI VI (Strong)	Freirina, Huasco, Vallenar, Combarbala, Illapel, La Higuera, Monte Patria, Ovalle, Punitaqui, Río Hurtado, Salamanca, Zapallar
MMI V (Moderate)	Alto del Carmen, Copiapo, Tierra Amarilla, Canela, Calera, Casablanca, La Cruz, Llaillay, Nogales, Olmue, Puchuncavi, Putaendo, Quillota, San Felipe, Santa Maria, Valparaíso, Villa Alemana, El Monte, Padre Hurtado, Peñaflor, Puente Alto, San Bernardo, Santiago, Talagante
MMI IV (Light)	Caldera, Chañaral, Diego de Almagro, Los Vilos, Quilpue, Las Cabras, Litueche, Mostazal, Navidad, Rancagua, San Fernando, Santa Cruz, Graneros, La Estrella
MMI III (Weak)	Algarrobo, Cartagena, El Quisco, El Tabo, San Antonio, Peralillo
MMI II (Weak)	Chimbarongo

== See also ==
- List of earthquakes in 2019
- List of earthquakes in Chile
