= Rudna mine =

Mine in Poland

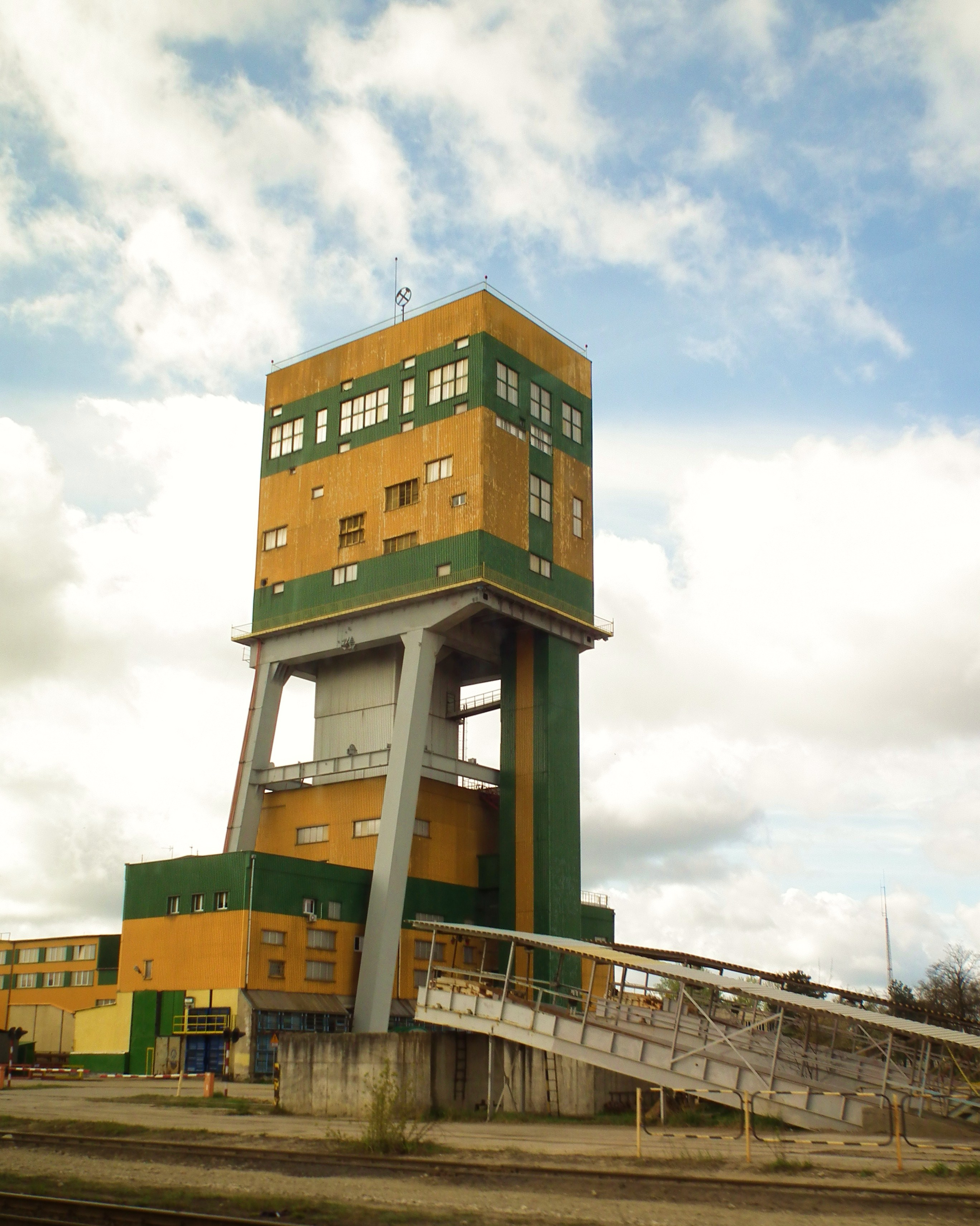

- Location within Poland
- Location: Polkowice, Polkowice County, Poland; 51°30′06″N 16°06′26″E
- Products: Copper
- Opened: 1969
- Company: KGHM Polska Miedź

The Rudna mine is a large underground mine in the west of Poland in Polkowice, Polkowice County, 350 kilometres (217 miles) south-west of the capital, Warsaw. Rudna represents one of the largest copper and silver reserve in Poland having estimated reserves of 513 million tonnes of ore grading 1.78% copper and 42 g/tonnes silver. The annual ore production is around 13 million tonnes from which 231,000 tonnes of copper and 546 tonnes of silver are extracted.

== Incidents ==
On 20 March 2013, 19 miners were pulled alive and well from the mine after being trapped 1,000 m (3,281 ft) underground for seven hours, following a small earthquake the previous night.

On 29 November 2016, a magnitude 4.4 earthquake at shallow depth left eight miners dead.
