= L'Esperance Rock =

Subtropical islet in the South Pacific, administrationally part of New Zealand

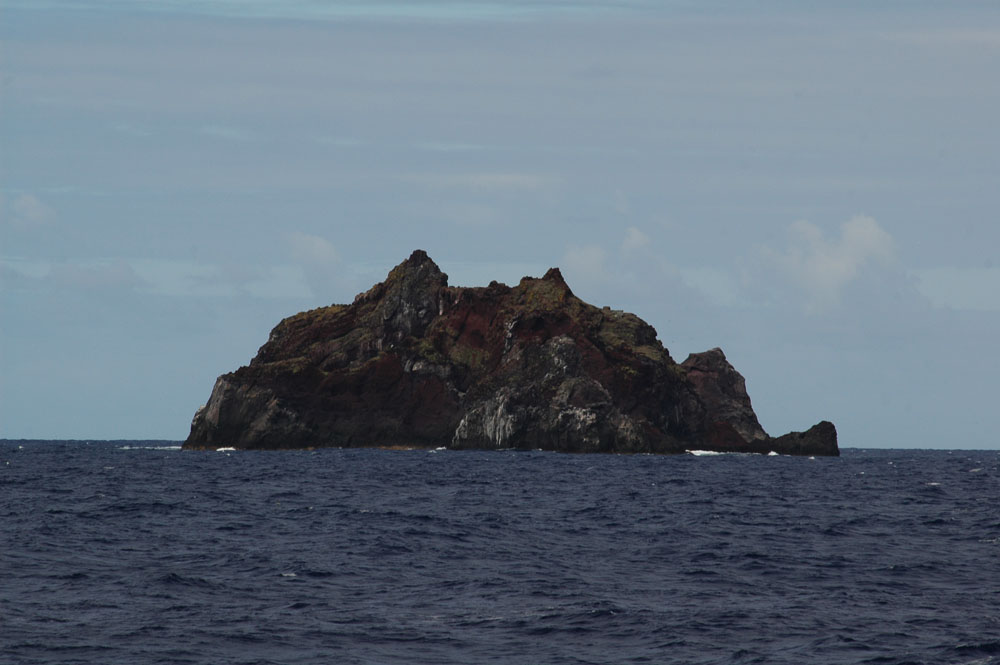
- The rock from northeast

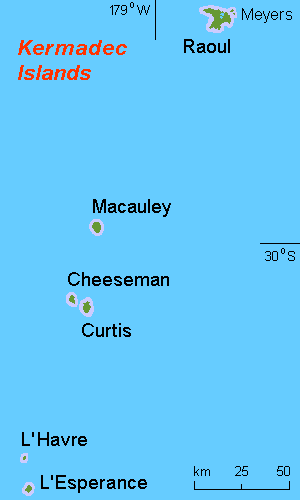
- L'Esperance Rock in the south of the Kermadec Islands

Geography
- Coordinates: 31.3545°S 178.8247°W
- Archipelago: Kermadec Islands
- Area: 4.8 ha (12 acres)
- Highest elevation: 70 m (230 ft)

Administration
- New Zealand

Demographics
- Population: 0

L'Esperance Rock, formerly known as French Rock and Brind Rock (named after William Brind), is the southernmost islet in the Kermadec Islands, to the north of New Zealand. It is 80 km (50 mi) south of Curtis Island and 600 km (370 mi) northeast of East Cape on New Zealand's North Island. The smaller L'Havre Rock lies 8 km (5 mi) to the north-west of L'Esperance; it is a reef that barely reaches the surface. L'Esperance Rock is 250 m (820 ft) in diameter with an area of 4.8 ha (12 acres). It rises to a height of 70 m (230 ft).

== Important Bird Area ==
The island forms part of the Kermadec Islands Important Bird Area, identified as such by BirdLife International because it is an important site for nesting seabirds. It is the site of a substantial breeding colony of grey noddies. Masked boobies have also been recorded breeding there.

== Flora ==
As well as other plants, there is an endemic species on the rock, Senecio esperensis.

== See also ==
- 2012 Kermadec Islands eruption and pumice raft
- New Zealand outlying islands
- List of islands of New Zealand
- List of islands
- Desert island
