= Gong County, Sichuan =

Gong County 珙县 • Langs Nkouk
- County
- Location in Sichuan
- Coordinates: 28.439°N 104.709°E
- Country: China
- Province: Sichuan
- Prefecture-level city: Yibin
- County seat: Xunchang

Area
  - Total: 1,150 km^{2} (440 sq mi)

Population (2020 census)
  - Total: 339,200
  - Density: 295/km^{2} (764/sq mi)
- Time zone: UTC+8 (China Standard)
- Website: www.gongxian.gov.cn

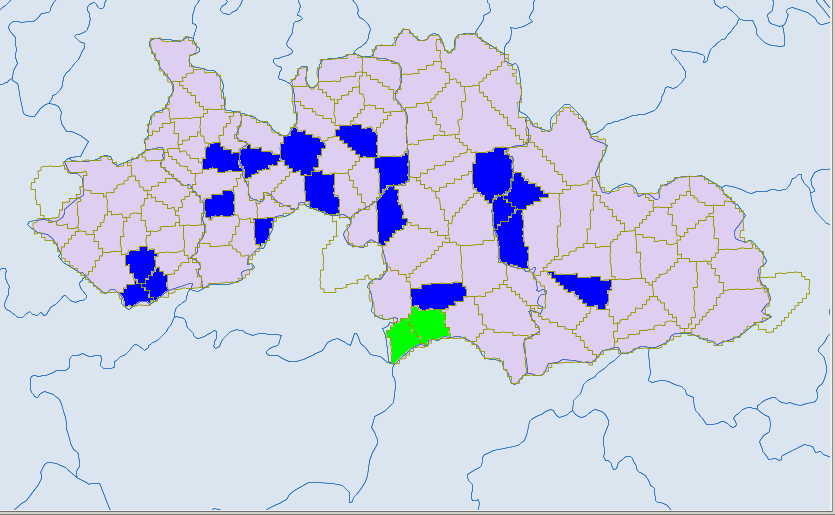
Ethnic townships in South Sichuan: Yibin and Luzhou. Light green -Yi. Blue - miao.

Gong County or Gongxian (simplified Chinese: 珙县; traditional Chinese: 珙縣; pinyin: Gǒng Xiàn) is a county located in southern Sichuan Province, China. It is under the administration of Yibin city. It is mainly known to travelers for the hanging coffins, a site which dates back nearly 3,000 years and is attributed to the Bo people, who died out around 400 years ago.

== Hanging coffins of Bo people ==
Hanging coffins carved from a single log are found in the areas once inhabited by Bo people (China).

== Administrative divisions ==
Gong County administers 10 towns and 3 ethnic townships.

- Gongquan Town (珙泉镇)
- Xunchang Town (巡场镇)
- Xiao'er Town (孝儿镇)
- Didong Town (底洞镇)
- Shangluo Town (上罗镇)
- Luobiao Town (洛表镇)
- Luohai Town (洛亥镇)
- Wangjia Town (王家镇)
- Mutan Town (沐滩镇)
- Caoying Town (曹营镇)
- Yuhe Miao Ethnic Township (玉和苗族乡, Dax Fab Jab Hmongb Xangb)
- Luodu Miao Ethnic Township (罗渡苗族乡, Ndongt Ngaox Lob Hmongb Xangb)
- Guandou Miao Ethnic Township (观斗苗族乡, Changs Chab Lob Hmongb Xangb)

== Climate ==
Climate data for Gongxian, elevation 368 m (1,207 ft), (1991–2020 normals, extremes 1981–2010)
Month	Jan	Feb	Mar	Apr	May	Jun	Jul	Aug	Sep	Oct	Nov	Dec	Year
Record high °C (°F)	20.6 (69.1)	26.9 (80.4)	33.1 (91.6)	36.5 (97.7)	37.8 (100.0)	37.8 (100.0)	39.4 (102.9)	40.5 (104.9)	40.0 (104.0)	32.4 (90.3)	27.3 (81.1)	20.7 (69.3)	40.5 (104.9)
Mean daily maximum °C (°F)	10.9 (51.6)	13.9 (57.0)	18.9 (66.0)	24.5 (76.1)	27.6 (81.7)	29.5 (85.1)	32.4 (90.3)	32.3 (90.1)	27.5 (81.5)	21.8 (71.2)	17.7 (63.9)	12.2 (54.0)	22.4 (72.4)
Daily mean °C (°F)	7.9 (46.2)	10.2 (50.4)	14.2 (57.6)	19.0 (66.2)	22.2 (72.0)	24.5 (76.1)	27.0 (80.6)	26.7 (80.1)	22.9 (73.2)	18.2 (64.8)	14.1 (57.4)	9.3 (48.7)	18.0 (64.4)
Mean daily minimum °C (°F)	6.1 (43.0)	7.9 (46.2)	11.3 (52.3)	15.4 (59.7)	18.6 (65.5)	21.3 (70.3)	23.4 (74.1)	23.1 (73.6)	20.2 (68.4)	16.2 (61.2)	12.0 (53.6)	7.5 (45.5)	15.2 (59.5)
Record low °C (°F)	−0.9 (30.4)	0.4 (32.7)	1.2 (34.2)	6.2 (43.2)	10.5 (50.9)	15.3 (59.5)	17.3 (63.1)	17.3 (63.1)	13.7 (56.7)	5.8 (42.4)	2.8 (37.0)	−1.7 (28.9)	−1.7 (28.9)
Average precipitation mm (inches)	32.9 (1.30)	31.2 (1.23)	49.8 (1.96)	86.9 (3.42)	109.2 (4.30)	175.5 (6.91)	210.2 (8.28)	214.0 (8.43)	138.0 (5.43)	93.6 (3.69)	40.9 (1.61)	33.7 (1.33)	1,215.9 (47.89)
Average precipitation days (≥ 0.1 mm)	15.7	12.9	15.3	14.1	15.7	17.4	15.1	14.0	15.7	19.4	14.2	15.1	184.6
Average snowy days	0.2	0.1	0	0	0	0	0	0	0	0	0	0.2	0.5
Average relative humidity (%)	85	82	78	76	76	82	81	80	84	87	86	86	82
Mean monthly sunshine hours	30.3	41.0	73.5	107.4	109.9	92.2	146.5	152.2	81.7	43.1	49.0	31.9	958.7
Percentage possible sunshine	9	13	20	28	26	22	35	38	22	12	15	10	21
Source: China Meteorological Administration

== Notable people ==
- Chang Xiangyu
