= Zamora =

Zamora may refer to:

== Places and jurisdictions ==
=== Europe ===
==== Spain ====
- Zamora, Spain, a city in the autonomous community of Castilla y León
- Province of Zamora, a province in the autonomous community of Castilla y León
- Associated with the city and province:
  - Roman Catholic Diocese of Zamora in Spain, Roman Catholic suffragan bishopric, named after its see
  - Zamora (Spanish Congress Electoral District)
  - Zamora (Cortes of Castile and León constituency)
  - Zamora (Senate constituency)

==== Romania ====
- Zamora, a tributary of the Valea de Pești in Hunedoara County
- Zamora, a tributary of the Prahova in Prahova County

=== Americas ===
==== Canada ====
- Zamora, British Columbia, a former community in the Boundary region

==== Ecuador ====
- Zamora, Ecuador, a city in the province of Zamora-Chinchipe
- Zamora-Chinchipe Province
- Zamora River, a river in the provinces of Loja, Zamora-Chinchipe and Morona-Santiago
- Zamora Canton, in the province of Zamora-Chinchipe
- Apostolic Vicariate of Zamora en Ecuador, Roman Catholic missionary circonscription, named after its see

==== Mexico ====
- Zamora, Michoacán, a city in the state of Michoacán
- Roman Catholic Diocese of Zamora (in Mexico), Roman Catholic suffragan bishopric, named after its see
- Zamora Municipality, Michoacán, a municipality in the state of Michoacán
- Gutiérrez Zamora, Veracruz, a municipality in the state of Veracruz

==== United States ====
- Zamora, California, an unincorporated community in Yolo County

==== Venezuela ====
- Zamora, Aragua, a municipality in the state of Aragua
- Zamora, Falcón, a municipality in the state of Falcón
- Zamora, Miranda, a municipality in the state of Miranda
- Zamora Province (Venezuela), in existence from 1862 to 1866

== People ==
- Zamora (surname), a Spanish surname, including a list of people with the name
- Bengt Nyholm (1930–2015), Swedish footballer nicknamed "Zamora"
- Zamora (pianist) (born 1979), Venezuelan musician
- Zamora the Torture King (born 1963), American circus performer

== Sports ==
- Club Deportivo Zamora, a Mexican football team
- FS Zamora, a Spanish futsal team
- Ricardo Zamora Trophy, a Spanish football award
- Zamora CF a Spanish football team
- Zamora FC, a Venezuelan football team

== Other uses ==
- Mission Zamora, a Venezuelan land reform programme
- Zamora (Conan the Barbarian), a fictional nation in the American pulp magazine series Conan the Barbarian
- Zamora, a fictional monk portrayed in The Book of Mirdad by Mikha'il Na'ima

== See also ==
- Lomas de Zamora
- Zamor (disambiguation)
