= Yantzaza =

- Town
- Location within Ecuador
- Coordinates: 3°51′0″S 78°45′0″W
- Country: Ecuador
- Province: Zamora Chinchipe
- Canton: Yantzaza Canton

Area
  - Town: 8.15 km^{2} (3.15 sq mi)

Population (2022 census)
  - Town: 13,335
  - Density: 1,640/km^{2} (4,240/sq mi)
- Climate: Af

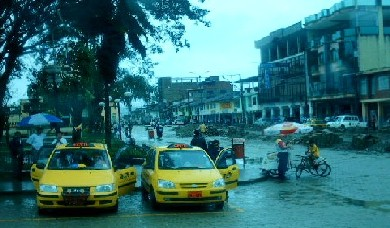
Parque Central de Yantzaza

Yantzaza is a town in the Zamora Chinchipe province of Ecuador. It is the seat of the Yantzaza Canton.

Yantzaza, with a population of 13,335, is the second most populated town of the province. It is also the province's principal economic and commercial center. It is located 42 kilometers (about 23 miles) from the city Zamora and is near the Zamora River's bank, on the Yantzaza Valley or Valley of Fireflies (Spanish: Valle de Yantzaza o Valle de las Luciérnagas).

== Name ==
The origin of its name comes from the word yanzatza in Shuar which means "valley of the fireflies," due to the constant presence of fireflies in the area.

== Economy ==
In the outskirts and surroundings of the city there is an intense form of stock breeding and an extensive strip mining system which supplies the local and national markets.

== Tourism ==
One of the more common tourist attractions for local inhabitants as well as foreign visitors is the discovery of marine shell fossils in the major avenue of the city, Avenue Iván Riofrío. The Central Park consists of plants and the native flower shrubs.

The most prominent building of the city is the new Illustrious City Hall of Yantzaza (Spanish: Ilustre Municipalidad de Yantzaza). There are other private buildings, which are the tallest in the city.

Other amenities include the Ottawa Recreational Center (Spanish: el Centro Recreacional Ottawa) whose services include a pool, sports court, and restaurant. Also nearby is the Municipal Sports Center (Spanish: el Complejo Deportivo Municipal) which is located towards the northern part of the city on Avenue Jaime Roldos Augilera.

In Quiringue, located 13 kilometers (about 8 miles) from Yantzaza, visitors can learn more about hand-woven fabrics. These fabrics are woven with the rare thread made from silk worms.
