= Montegrande (archaeological site) =

Mayo-Chinchipe archaeological site in Peruvian Amazon

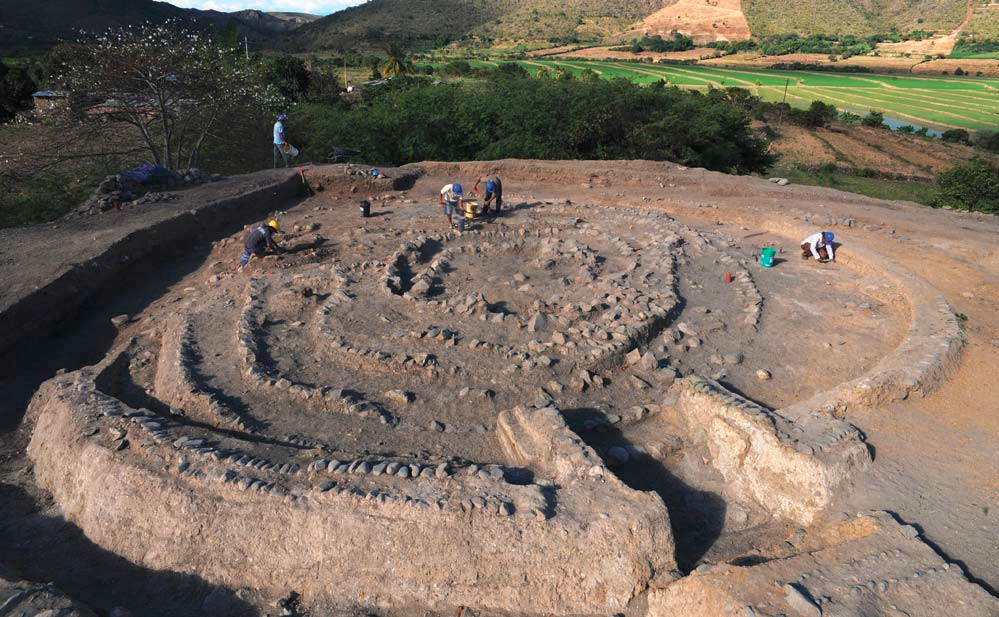
- The site in 2015

- Location in Peru
- 5°42′57″S 78°47′37″W
- Type: Settlement
- Cultures: Mayo-Chinchipe
- Location: Jaen, Cajamarca, Peru

History
- Built: c. 3000 BC
- Abandoned: c. 3000 BC

Site notes
- Area: 2 acres
- Archaeologists: Francisco Valdez; Quirino Olivera

Huaca Montegrande is a pre-Columbian Peruvian archaeological site in Jaén District,, in the Cajamarca department. It is a spiral-shaped temple or enclosure built around 6,000 BP, by the Marañón culture that overlapped the current border with Ecuador, where this civilization is known as Mayo Chinchipe. At around 6,000 years old, the site is older than Caral. The site is located at the outskirts of the town of Jaén, Peru.

== Excavations ==
Excavations began in 2009 with funding from the Andean Community, for eight Ecuadorian archaeologists, led by Francisco Valdez, and nine Peruvian archaeologists, directed by Quirino Olivera.

On the Peruvian side, the sites of Casual and Las Juntas in Bagua, were excavated, as well as at Montegrande and San Isidro in Jaén. Until then it had been thought that the sites were simply hills, on top of which the Bracamoros pre-Inca culture had left some remains. Constructions so ancient in that area of the Peruvian jungle had not been considered. Only archaeologist Julio C. Tello had postulated (circa 1920) an Amazonian origin for Andean culture, but other researchers dismissed this at the time.

Atop Montegrande hill the foundations of an abandoned, half-built Catholic church were found. The place had become a dump and smoking place. The site was cleared and the modern constructions removed. Excavations initially revealed yellow steps and floors. Then they removed a layer of clay and pebbles, revealing an impressive spiral architectural structure. The excavations also uncovered the remains of a man who apparently was sacrificed before the construction was complete.

At other sites investigated by the binational archaeological project, important discoveries were also made. In San Isidro an elite burial was discovered. In Casual and Las Juntas polychrome murals were found, different from those of both the highland and coastal cultures. On the Ecuadorian side, a spiral architectural structure, similar to Montegrande, was discovered at the Santa Ana-La Florida site in Palanda Canton, and the tomb of an elite personage was found, as well as evidence of cacao cultivation dating back 5,500 to 5,350 years, in other words 1,500 years older than that earlier found in Mexico. Until then, domesticated cacao had been thought to have a Mesoamerican origin.

This ancient culture is now known as Mayo-Chinchipe Marañón; its area extends from the Podocarpus National Park in Ecuador, to the area where Chinchipe River flows into the Marañon (near Bagua, Peru).

== Spiral construction ==
The spiral enclosure of Montegrande is built of adobe and close to 70% of river stones and 30% of mountain stones. It is believed to have been a ceremonial temple, with a tomb beneath the center of the spiral where someone important lays, possibly a healer or a priest, if it follows the pattern of the sites in Palanda and San Isidro.

Spirals seem to have had special meaning in the beliefs of the Andean and Amazonian world, as well as other ancient civilizations around the world. Archaeologists believe it might represents a coiled snake, a symbolism that also appears at other sites nearby. The spiral shape is also reflected in the famous Nazca Lines (monkey geoglyph). It is the shape of the snail, or Spondylus, of the Ecuadorian coast, also found in Jaén and Bagua, showing that trade took place between these territories.

== Other findings ==
Several pieces have been found inside Huaca Montegrande like ceramic pieces (pots, jaguar's head, macaw's head, etc), stone sculptures (cacao pod, cacao seed, etc), various human burials, evidence of Amazonian foods, camelid offerings, fire pit remains and the evidence of the oldest Theobroma Cacao to date, used for ritualistic purposes.

== See also ==
- Andean culture (disambiguation)
