= Roman Catholic Diocese of Zamora =

(Roman Catholic) Diocese of Zamora may refer to the following Catholic jurisdictions, each with an episcopal see called Zamora :

proper bishoprics

- Roman Catholic Diocese of Zamora in Spain, after which the others were named in colonial days
- Roman Catholic Diocese of Zamora in Mexico

pre-diocesan see

- Apostolic Vicariate of Zamora in Ecuador
