= Zamora (surname) =

Zamora is a toponymic surname referring to the city of Zamora, Spain.

== People with the name ==
=== Arts and entertainment ===
- Antonio de Zamora (1660–1727), Spanish playwright
- Cynthia Zamora (1938–2019), Filipino actress
- Gwen Zamora (born 1990), Filipina-Italian actress, model, and dancer
- Javier Zamora, Salvadoran-American poet and activist
- Ramon Zamora (1935–2007), Filipino actor and martial artist
- Tico Zamora (born 1967), American rock musician
- Tye Zamora (born 1977), American musician
- Vanessa Zamora (born 1991), Mexican singer-songwriter
- Zamora the Torture King (born 1963), American circus performer
- Zamora (pianist) (born 1979), Venezuelan musician

=== Journalism ===
- José Rubén Zamora (born 1956), Guatemalan journalist
- Marcela Zamora, (born 1980), Salvadoran-Nicaraguan documentary director and journalist

=== Politics ===
- Francis Zamora (born 1977), Filipino politician, businessman, and basketball player
- Jesús Jiménez Zamora (1823–1897), Costa Rican president
- Manuel Escudero Zamora (1946–2026), Spanish economist and politician
- Manuel E. Zamora (born 1950), Filipino politician
- Maricar Zamora, Filipino politician
- Martha Lucía Zamora (born 1960), Colombian lawyer and politician
- Mauricio Zamora, Bolivian politician
- Mery Zamora (born 1972), Ecuadorian teacher, politician, and union leader
- Niceto Alcalá-Zamora (1877–1949), Spanish president
- Pilar Zamora (born 1971), Spanish politician
- Ronaldo Zamora (born 1944), Filipino lawyer and politician
- Rubén Zamora (born 1942), Salvadoran politician
- Víctor Hugo Zamora (born 1970), Bolivian politician
- Xavier Espot Zamora (born 1979), Andorran politician and current prime minister of Andorra

=== Religion ===
- Jacinto Zamora (1835–1872) Filipino secular priest
- Nicolás Zamora (1875–1914), Filipino Methodist minister

=== Sport ===
==== Association football ====
- Alejandro Zamora (born 1984), Spanish footballer
- Bobby Zamora (born 1981), English footballer
- Jairon Zamora (born 1978), Ecuadorean footballer
- Jesús María Zamora (born 1955), Spanish footballer
- José Zamora (born 1988), Spanish footballer
- Julio Zamora (born 1966), Argentine footballer and manager
- Ricardo Zamora (1901–1978), Spanish footballer
- Steven Zamora (born 1989), Ecuadorian footballer

==== Other sports ====
- Alfonso Zamora (born 1954), Mexican Olympic boxer
- Andrés Zamora (born 1983), Uruguayan Olympic long distance runner
- Brittney Zamora (born 1999), American stock car racer
- Daniel Zamora (born 1993), American baseball player
- Freddy Zamora (born 1998), American baseball player
- Gastón Zamora (born 1918), Bolivian tennis player

=== Other people ===
- Brittany Zamora (criminal), American sexual predator
- Diane Zamora (born 1978), American murderer
- Ezequiel Zamora (1817–1860), Venezuelan military commander
- José Ángel Zamora López, Spanish antiquity historian
- Lonnie Zamora (1933–2009), English-American police officer
- Manuel A. Zamora (1870–1929), Filipino chemist and pharmacist
- Pedro Zamora (1972–1994), Cuban–American AIDS activist
- Pedro Zamora Álvarez (1964–2007), Guatemalan trade unionist

== See also ==
- Zamora (disambiguation)
