= Santa Ana (La Florida) =

Archaeological site in Zamora Chinchipe, Ecuador

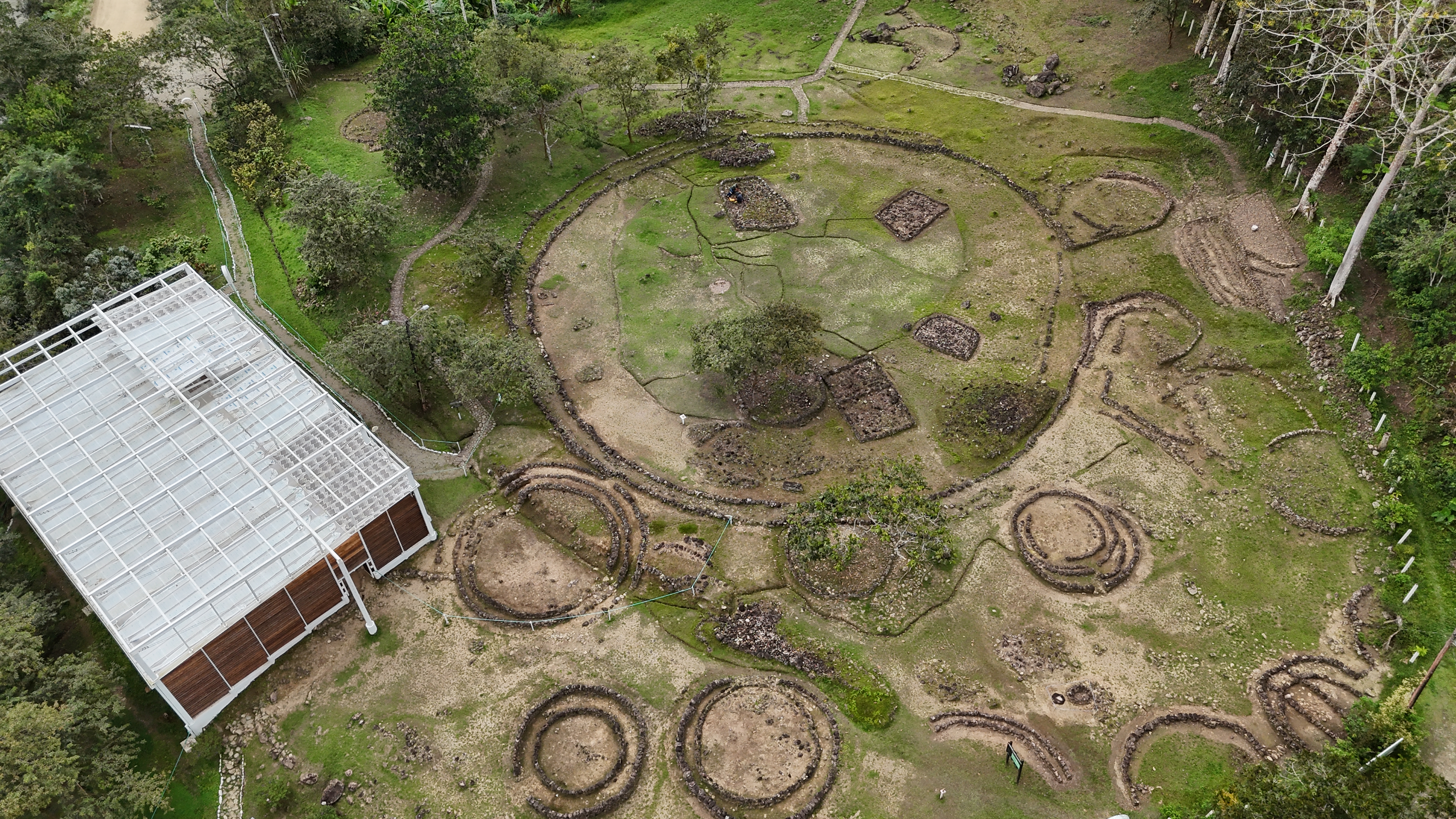
- The site in 2025

- Location in Ecuador
- 4.6399°S 79.1322°W
- Type: Settlement
- Location: Zamora-Chinchipe, Ecuador

History
- Built: c. 3500 BC
- Abandoned: c. 1700 BC

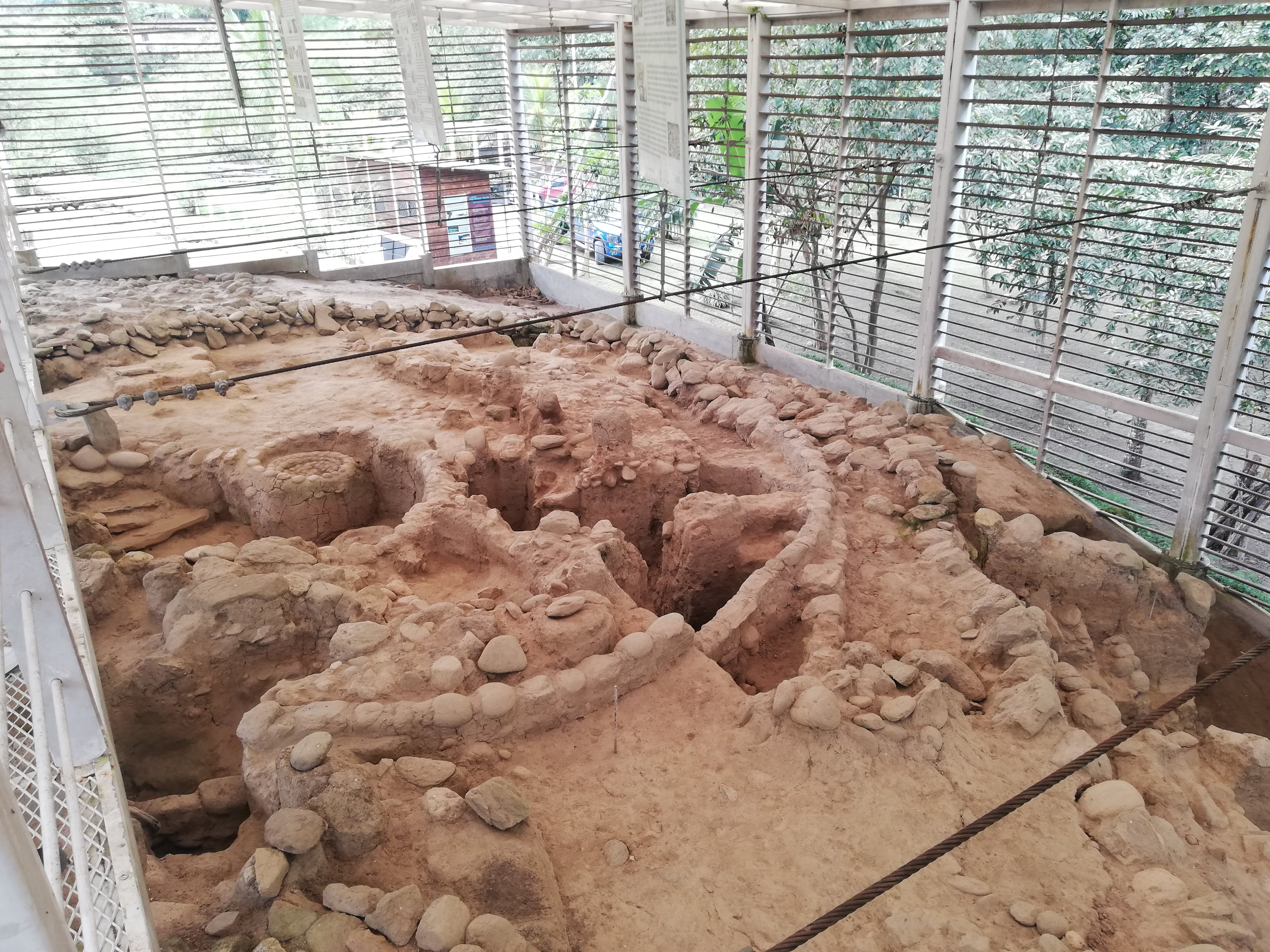

Santa Ana (La Florida) is an important archaeological site in the highlands of Ecuador, going back as early as 3500 BC. It is located in the Palanda Canton, just to the north of its regional capital of Palanda, in the Zamora-Chinchipe, Ecuador.

== Geography ==
This ancient settlement is located on the eastern slope of the Andes, in a transitional zone between the highlands and the lowland jungles in a narrow Palanda River valley. The small Palanda River flows into the Mayo and Chinchipe Rivers, and eventually into the Maranon River.

The two principal zones of the site cover an area of about 1 hectare.

== Research ==
The work in this area was started in 2002 by a team of French and Ecuadoran archaeologists.

Santa-Ana/La Florida has been studied by archaeologists since then, under the leadership of Francisco Valdez. This represents a discovery of a new ancient culture in the Chinchipe river basin on the border of present-day Ecuador and Peru.

It is now known as Mayo-Chinchipe culture; its area extends from the Podocarpus National Park in Ecuador, to the area where Chinchipe River flows into the Marañon (near Bagua, Peru). This ancient culture received its name from the river names. In Ecuador, the river is known as Chinchipe, while in Peru it's known as Mayo.

Carbon dated to 5,500 BP (3500 BC), these discoveries belong to the early Formative Period in Ecuadorian chronology, and to the Archaic or Preceramic period of Peru. A village with a central sunken plaza has been discovered. One of the two artificial platforms features a temple with a spiral configuration, and a ceremonial hearth, where a cache of greenstone offerings had been found.

"Several tombs have been documented with fine ceramic vessels; exquisite polished stone bowls and mortars, as well as hundreds of turquoise and malachite beads fragments of Strombus sea shells, and small sculptures."

A range of diverse objects have been found, such as ceramic bottles, plain or ornamented stone bowls, medallions and pieces of necklace in turquoise, malachite and other green stones.

Major construction at the site occurred from around 2600 to 1700 BC.

The related Montegrande (archaeological site) is also located nearby on the Peruvian side of the border.

There was also trade between Santa Ana and the site of Huayurco north of Jaen, Peru. Distinctive Huayurco stone vessels were traded widely in neighbouring areas. The Jaén stone vessel tradition, and its participation within the Andean interaction spheres have now been dated as early as 2500 BC.

== Agriculture ==
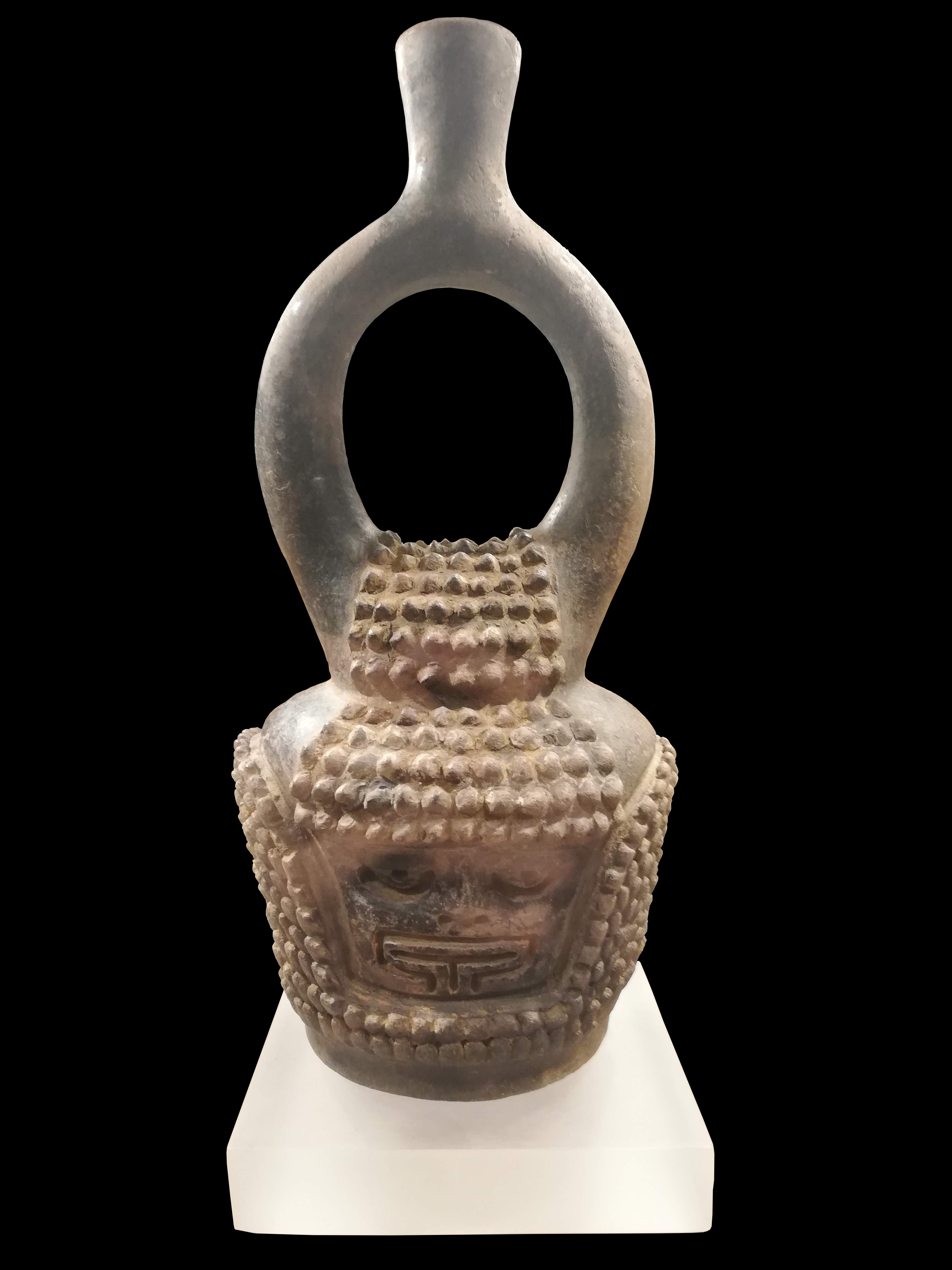
Cacao remains were found in the interior of this stirrup bottle found at Santa Ana-La Florida

The following agricultural crops have been documented,

- corn (Zea mays),
- beans (Fabacceae),
- manioc (Manihot esculenta),
- sweet potato (Ipomooea sp.),
- Dioscorea sp.,
- Arrowroot (Maranta sp.),
- hot peppers (Capsicum sp.),
- cacao (Theobroma sp.)
- coca (Erythroxylum coca)

=== Earliest archaeological evidence of Cacao use ===
In 2018, the Nature Ecology and Evolution journal reported from Santa Ana what is believed to be the earliest cacao (Theobroma cacao L.) use in the Americas. This evidence, comes from around 3300 BC.

Traditionally, cacao was thought to have been first domesticated in Mesoamerica. Yet it's known that cacao's greatest genetic diversity is in the upper Amazon region of northwest South America. Thus, this region must have been the ultimate centre of origin. But how it got from there to Mexico remained unknown. Now Santa Ana provides the missing link.

The scholars used three independent lines of archaeological evidence (cacao starch grains, absorbed theobromine residues and ancient DNA dating) to confirm their findings.

So far, this is the earliest evidence of Cacao use in the Americas. Also, this is the first clear archaeological evidence of its pre-Columbian use on the South American continent.

== See also ==
- Pre-Columbian Ecuador
- Cultural periods of Peru
- Ancient Peru
- Montegrande

== Bibliography ==
- Human settlements already existed in the Amazon Basin (Ecuador) 4000 years ago - 12 May 2004 eurekalert.org
- Valdez, Francisco. “Inter-zonal relationships in Ecuador”, in Handbook of South American Archaeology, Helaine Silverman y William Isbell eds., Springer, pp. 865–891, 2008
- Valdez, Francisco; Jean Gufroy; Geoffroy de Saulieu; Julio Hurtado; Alexandra Yépez (2005), Découverte d’un site cérémoniel formatif sur le versant oriental des Andes Proyecto Zamora Chinchipe
