= Mayo-Chinchipe =

Culture in current-day Ecuador and Peru

Location in Ecuador and Peru

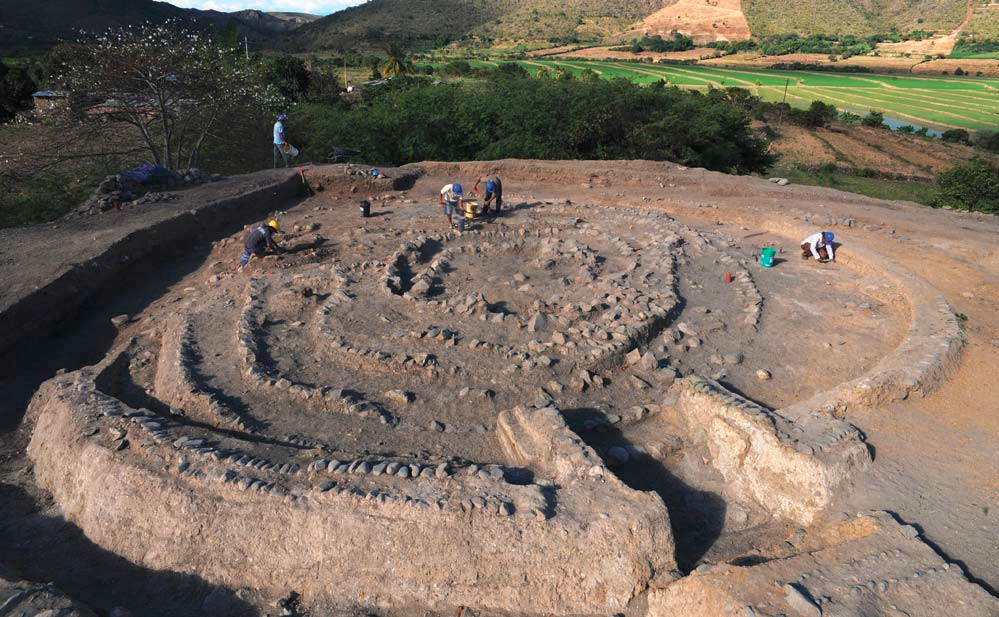
Ceremonial site of Montegrande in Peru showing a characteristic spiral construction

The Mayo-Chinchipe or Mayo-Chinchipe-Marañon culture existed from c. 5500 – 1700 BCE in the highlands of what is now Ecuador and Peru, along the eastern slopes of the Amazonian Andes.

== Location ==
It extended from the sources of Valladolid river, in the Podocarpus National Park in Ecuador, to where Chinchipe flows into the Marañon River in the area of Bagua, Peru, and received its name from the river names.

== Culture ==
The best known Mayo-Chinchipe site is Santa Ana (La Florida), where a temple and ceremonial hearth have been found.

Also at Montegrande, related ceremonial centers were found. In the same general area, in Palanda, Ecuador (just across the border with Peru), a tomb was found with stone and ceramic artifacts, as well as cacao and Spondylus shells. Another related site is San Isidro, in Peru, close to Jaén (Jaén District), and in the same general area as Montegrande.

The culture is believed to have included shamanism and other specialist work roles. It used stone and pottery technologies, and consumed cacao and possibly corn beer.

The Mayo-Chinchipe culture is considered one of the centres of origin of agriculture.

== Trading ==
The culture is believed to have traded plants with coastal cultures such as the Valdivia.
