= Pristimantis rhodostichus =

Conservation status
- Least Concern (IUCN 3.1)

Scientific classification
- Kingdom: Animalia
- Phylum: Chordata
- Class: Amphibia
- Order: Anura
- Clade: Brachycephaloidea
- Family: Craugastoridae
- Genus: Pristimantis
- Species: P. rhodostichus

Binomial name
- Pristimantis rhodostichus (Duellman & Pramuk, 1999)

Synonyms
- Eleutherodactylus rhodostichus Duellman & Pramuk, 1999

Species of frog

Pristimantis rhodostichus is a species of frog in the family Strabomantidae. It is found in the Zamora-Chinchipe Province of southern Ecuador and the Amazonas Department of northern Peru.

Its natural habitat are primary cloud and montane forests. It is threatened by habitat loss caused by agriculture and logging.
