= Ezequiel Zamora Municipality =

Ezequiel Zamora Municipality may refer to the following places in the Venezuela:

- Ezequiel Zamora Municipality, Barinas
- Ezequiel Zamora Municipality, Cojedes
- Ezequiel Zamora Municipality, Monagas

== See also ==
- Zamora (disambiguation)
