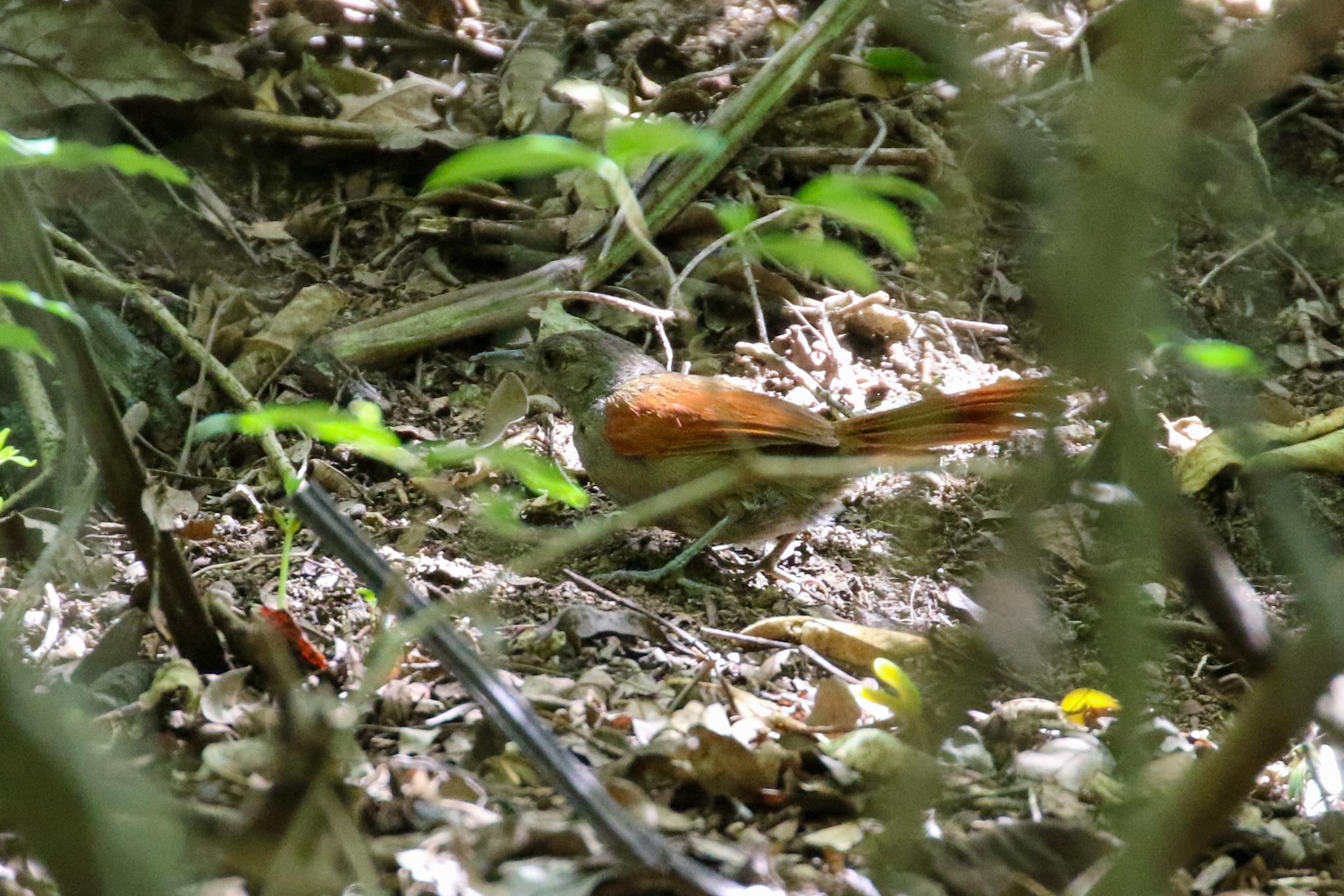

Conservation status
- Critically Endangered (IUCN 3.1)

Scientific classification
- Kingdom: Animalia
- Phylum: Chordata
- Class: Aves
- Order: Passeriformes
- Family: Furnariidae
- Genus: Synallaxis
- Species: S. maranonica

Binomial name
- Synallaxis maranonica Taczanowski, 1879

= Marañón spinetail =

Species of bird

The Maranon spinetail (Note: The IOC spells the English name with no diacritics. Other taxonomic systems and authors spell it Marañon or Marañón. The IOC is the Wikipedia standard for bird names.) (Synallaxis maranonica) is a Critically Endangered species of bird in the Furnariinae subfamily of the ovenbird family Furnariidae. It is found in Ecuador and Peru.

== Taxonomy and systematics ==
The Maranon spinetail was previously treated as a subspecies of the plain-crowned spinetail (S. gujanensis). Recognition of plumage, vocal, and genetic differences led to their separation. The Marañon spinetail is monotypic.

== Description ==
The Maranon spinetail is 14 to 16 cm (5.5 to 6.3 in) long and weighs 16 to 17 g (0.56 to 0.60 oz). The sexes have the same plumage. Adults have a dark brownish-gray face and forehead. Their crown and upper back are dark grayish brown that becomes more rufescent brown by the rump and uppertail coverts. Their wings are dark rufous with dark fuscous tips on the flight feathers. Their tail is dark rufous; it is graduated, and the feathers have blunt tips. Their throat is pale grayish, their breast darker brownish gray, their belly a lighter brownish gray, and their flanks gray with an olive tinge. Their iris is brown, their maxilla black to dark gray, their mandible blue-gray, and their legs and feet gray to olive. Juveniles have faint dark scallops on the breast and belly and a pinkish-yellow mandible.

== Distribution and habitat ==
The Maranon spinetail is found in the valley of the Marañón River from far southeastern Ecuador's Zamora-Chinchipe Province south into the northern parts of Peru's departments of Cajamarca and Amazonas. It inhabits the undergrowth of semihumid gallery forest, secondary forest, and deciduous woodlands along rivers, and occurs less often at the edges of humid forest. In elevation it ranges between 650 and 1,200 m (2,100 and 3,900 ft) in Ecuador and 450 and 1,850 m (1,500 and 6,100 ft) in Peru.

== Behavior ==
=== Movement ===
The Maranon spinetail is a year-round resident throughout its range.

=== Feeding ===
The Maranon spinetail feeds on arthropods. It usually forages in pairs, gleaning its prey from the ground, foliage, and small branches up to about 2 m (7 ft) above the ground.

=== Breeding ===
Nothing is known about the Maranon spinetail's breeding biology.

=== Vocalization ===
The Maranon spinetail's song is "a very slow-paced, somewhat nasal 'kieeuuw...keeeu' ", often with several seconds between phrases. It is sung by both sexes.

== Status ==
The IUCN originally assessed the Maranon spinetail as Vulnerable but since 2012 has rated it Critically Endangered. It has a limited range and its estimated population of 6000 to 15,000 mature individuals is believed to be decreasing. "Much of its woodland habitat has progressively deteriorated owing to widespread and long-term cultivation of land within the Marañón drainage. The spread of oil-palm plantations, cattle-ranching and logging all seriously threaten its remaining habitat, with oil extraction a potential future problem." It is considered uncommon in Ecuador and locally fairly common in Peru, but because it is difficult to see it may be overlooked.
