= Yantzaza Canton =

- Canton
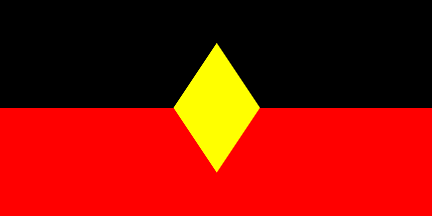
- Flag

- Location of Zamora Chinchipe Province in Ecuador.

- Cantons of Zamora Chinchipe Province
- Coordinates: 3°51′0″S 78°45′0″W
- Country: Ecuador
- Province: Zamora-Chinchipe Province

Area
  - Total: 1,013 km^{2} (391 sq mi)

Population (2022 census)
  - Total: 23,370
  - Density: 23.07/km^{2} (59.75/sq mi)
- Time zone: UTC-5 (ECT)

Yantzaza Canton is a canton of Ecuador, located in the Zamora-Chinchipe Province. Its capital is the town of Yantzaza. Its population at the 2001 census was 14,552.
