= Apostolic Vicariate of Zamora in Ecuador =

Catholic missionary jurisdiction in Ecuador

Apostolic Vicariate of Zamora en Ecuador Apostolicus Vicariatus Zamorensis in Aequatoria

Location
- Country: Ecuador

Statistics
- Area: 10,556 km^{2} (4,076 sq mi)
- Population: Total; Catholics: (as of 2024); 160,513; 109,858 (68.4%)
- Parishes: 19

Information
- Denomination: Catholic Church
- Sui iuris church: Latin Church
- Rite: Roman Rite
- Established: 17 February 1893; 133 years ago
- Secular priests: 25 (19 Diocesan, 6 Religious Orders)

Current leadership
- Pope: Leo XIV
- Apostolic Vicar: Jaime Oswaldo Castillo Villacrés

Map
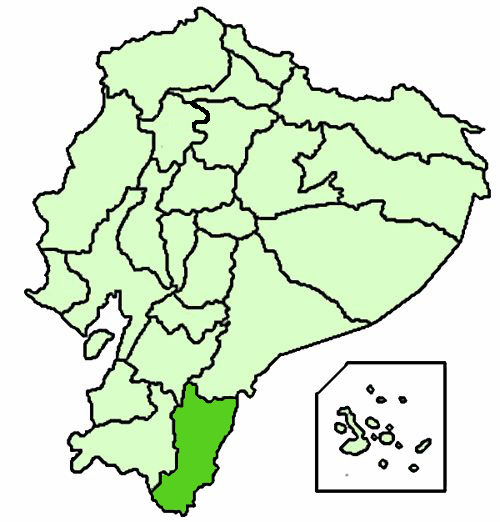

The Apostolic Vicariate (or Vicariate Apostolic) of Zamora en [i.e. in] Ecuador (Latin: Apostolicus Vicariatus Zamorensis in Aequatoria) is a missionary circonscription of the Roman Catholic Church.

Its cathedral see is located in the city of Zamora, in Ecuador's Amazonian Zamora-Chinchipe province. It is exempt, i.e. directly subject to the Holy See, not part of any ecclesiastical province.

== History ==
On 17 February 1893, Pope Leo XIII established the Vicariate Apostolic of Zamora from the Ecuadorian Apostolic Vicariate of Napo.

Its name was changed slightly by Pope John Paul II to the Apostolic Vicariate of Zamora en Ecuador on 22 February 1991. This avoids confusion with other cities called Zamora, in Europe and the Americas (including bishoprics in Spain and Mexico).

== Ordinaries ==
Apostolic Vicars of Zamora

  - Apostolic Administrator Manuel Moncayo, O.F.M. (18 Nov 1949 – 1959)
  - Apostolic Administrator Jorge Francisco Mosquera Barreiro, O.F.M. (16 Mar 1959 – 21 Apr 1964)
- Jorge Francisco Mosquera Barreiro, O.F.M. (21 Apr 1964 – 10 Sep 1982), resigned
- Serafín Luis Alberto Cartagena Ocaña, O.F.M. (10 Sep 1982 – 22 Feb 1991 see below)

Apostolic Vicars of Zamora en Ecuador

- Serafín Luis Alberto Cartagena Ocaña, O.F.M. (see above 22 Feb 1991 – 1 Feb 2003), retired
- Fausto Trávez Trávez, O.F.M. (1 Feb 2003 – 27 Mar 2008), appointed Bishop of Babahoyo
- Walter Jehowá Heras Segarra, O.F.M. (25 Mar 2009 – 31 Oct 2019), appointed Bishop of Loja
- Jaime Castillo Villacrés (17 Nov 2020 – Present)

== See also ==
- Roman Catholicism in Ecuador
