= Chinchipe Canton =

- Canton
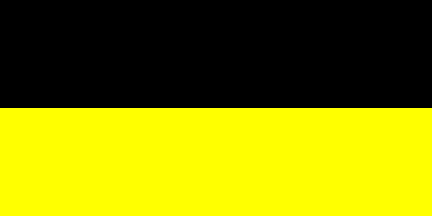
- Flag

- Location of Zamora Chinchipe Province in Ecuador.

- Cantons of Zamora Chinchipe Province
- Coordinates: 4.8628°S 79.1328°W
- Country: Ecuador
- Province: Zamora-Chinchipe Province
- Capital: Zumba

Population (2001)
  - Total: 8,495
- Time zone: UTC-5 (ECT)

Chinchipe Canton is a canton of Ecuador, located in the Zamora-Chinchipe Province. Its capital is the town of Zumba. Its population at the 2001 census was 8,495.
