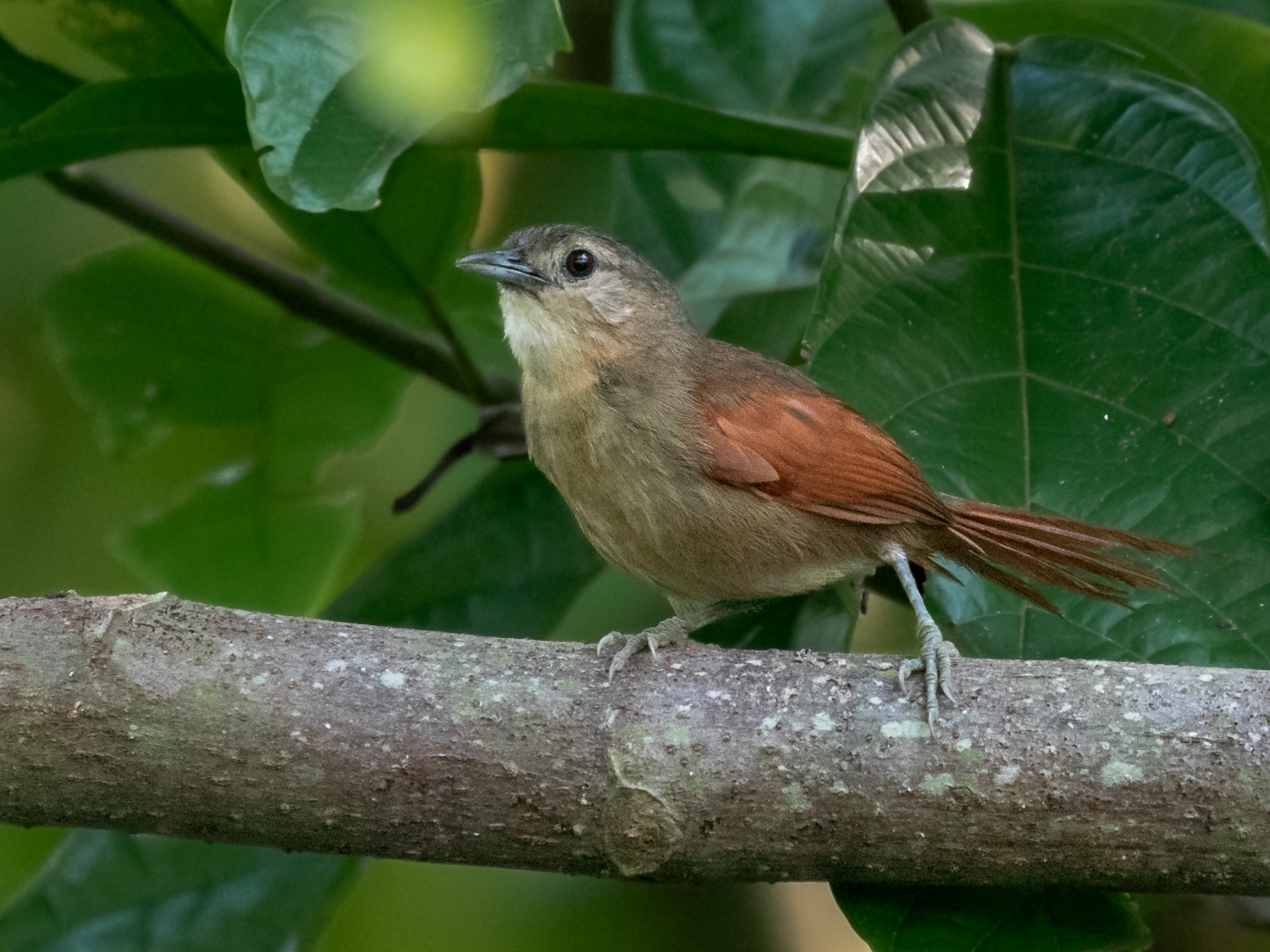

Conservation status
- Least Concern (IUCN 3.1)

Scientific classification
- Kingdom: Animalia
- Phylum: Chordata
- Class: Aves
- Order: Passeriformes
- Family: Furnariidae
- Genus: Synallaxis
- Species: S. gujanensis

Binomial name
- Synallaxis gujanensis (Gmelin, JF, 1789)

= Plain-crowned spinetail =

Species of bird

The plain-crowned spinetail (Synallaxis gujanensis) is a species of bird in the Furnariinae subfamily of the ovenbird family Furnariidae. It is found in Bolivia, Brazil, Colombia, Ecuador, French Guiana, Guyana, Peru, Suriname, and Venezuela.

== Taxonomy and systematics ==
The plain-crowned spinetail was formally described in 1789 by the German naturalist Johann Friedrich Gmelin in his revised and expanded edition of Carl Linnaeus's Systema Naturae. He placed it with the wagtails in the genus Motacilla and coined the binomial name Motacilla gujanensis. Gmelin based his description on "Le rouge-queue de la Guyanne" that had been described and illustrated in 1778 by the French polymath, the Comte de Buffon. The specific epithet gujanensis is from the type locality, the Guianas. The plain-crowned spinetail is one of 37 spinetails in the genus Synallaxis that was introduced in 1818 by Louis Pierre Vieillot.

Six subspecies are recognized:

- S. g. columbiana Chapman, 1914
- S. g. gujanensis (Gmelin, JF, 1789)
- S. g. huallagae Cory, 1919
- S. g. canipileus Chapman, 1923
- S. g. inornata Pelzeln, 1856
- S. g. certhiola Todd, 1916

What are in 2023 the Araguaia spinetail (S. simoni), the white-lored spinetail (S. albilora), and the Maranon spinetail (S. maranonica) were previously treated as subspecies of the plain-crowned. The four are a monophyletic group.

== Description ==
The plain-crowned spinetail is 15 to 17 cm (5.9 to 6.7 in) long and weighs 13 to 22 g (0.46 to 0.78 oz). The sexes have the same plumage. Adults of the nominate subspecies S. g. gujanensis have a faint grayish buff supercilium on an otherwise grayish brown face. Their crown and upperparts are dull brownish that is slightly grayer and darker on the forecrown. Their wings are dark rufous with duller tips on the flight feathers. Their tail is dark rufous; it is graduated and the feathers have pointy tips. Their throat is whitish and their breast, flanks, and undertail coverts are brownish. Their belly is lighter than the rest of their underparts. Their iris is brown to light brown, their maxilla blackish, their mandible gray to pale gray (sometimes with a blackish tip), and their legs and feet olive-gray to greenish yellow or blue-gray. Juveniles have faint dusky scallops on their breast.

Subspecies S. g. columbiana has much whiter underparts and grayer (less tawny) flanks than the nominate. S. g. huallagae is darker and grayer than the nominate, with olivaceous flanks. S. g. canipileus is similar to huallagae but with grayer underparts and paler wings and tail. S. g. inornata has richer brown upperparts than the nominate, with a buffier face and much brighter rusty underparts. S. g. certhiola has a grayish face, a somewhat olivaceous back, a buffy white center to the belly, and wings, tail, and underparts that are intermediate between the rather plain nominate and the richly colored inornata.

Several of the subspecies intergrade along their contact zones.

== Distribution and habitat ==
The subspecies of the plain-crowned spinetail are found thus:

- S. g. columbiana: south-central Colombia between the departments of Meta and Putumayo
- S. g. gujanensis: eastern and southern Venezuela east through the Guianas and northern and eastern Brazil to the Atlantic and south as far as northern Mato Grosso
- S. g. huallagae: southeastern Colombia, eastern Ecuador, eastern Peru, and northern Bolivia
- S. g. canipileus: southeastern Peru's Cuzco and Puno departments
- S. g. inornata: west-central Brazil's Amazonas state south of the Amazon into northeastern Bolivia
- S. g. certhiola: eastern Bolivia in Santa Cruz and southern Beni departments

The plain-crowned spinetail inhabits a variety of landscapes, most of which are close to water. They include gallery forest, the edges of várzea forest, secondary forest, and scrubby areas with Gynerium cane amid Cecropia woodlands on river islands. It also occurs in the dense regrowth in clearcuts and in plantations. In elevation it is found below 1,200 m (3,900 ft), but reaches only 1,000 m (3,300 ft) in Colombia, 600 m (2,000 ft) in Venezuela, and 400 m (1,300 ft) in Ecuador.

== Behavior ==
=== Movement ===
The plain-crowned spinetail is a year-round resident throughout its range.

=== Feeding ===
The plain-crowned spinetail feeds on arthropods. It usually forages in pairs, on the ground and in the understorey up to about 2 m (7 ft) above the ground. It gleans its prey from leaf litter, grass, and small branches.

=== Breeding ===
The plain-crowned spinetail's breeding season has not been defined but appears to vary geographically and in some areas be extended. In Suriname, eggs have been noted in January, March, between May and September, and December. The species' nest is a globe of sticks that can be twice as long as it is wide, with a horizontal tunnel leading to the egg chamber. It is typically placed in dense vegetation about 1 to 2 m (3 to 7 ft) above the ground. The clutch size is two to three eggs. The incubation period, time to fledging, and details of parental care are not known.

=== Vocalization ===
The plain-crowned spinetail's song varies geographically. In northeastern Brazil it is "2 well-separated notes, 1st note high, sharp, explosive 'Whip', 2nd note lower 'wuh', together as 'Whip wuh' ". In western Brazil (inornata) it is " 'tjuh mcweet', 1st part slightly downslurred, 'weet' much higher". The song in Ecuador is rendered "a leisurely 'keé, kuh' repeated at several-second intervals".

== Status ==
The IUCN has assessed the plain-crowned spinetail as being of Least Concern. It has an extremely large range and an unknown population size that is believed to be stable. No immediate threats have been identified. It is considered fairly common to common in most of its range though local in Colombia and Venezuela.
