= Zamor (disambiguation) =

Zamor (1762–1820) was a French revolutionary of Bengali origin.

Zamor may also refer to:

- Zamor (artist) (born 1951), a Colombian and French artist, writer, historian, and philosopher
- Oreste Zamor (1861–1915), president of Haiti from February to October 1914
- Emmanuel Zamor (1840-1919), French painter and musician
