= El Pangui Canton =

- Canton
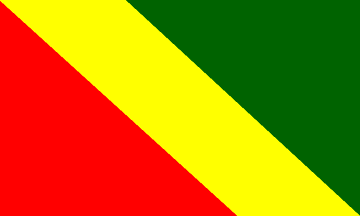
- Flag

- Location of Zamora Chinchipe Province in Ecuador.

- Cantons of Zamora Chinchipe Province
- Coordinates: 3.6249°S 78.5871°W
- Country: Ecuador
- Province: Zamora-Chinchipe Province
- Time zone: UTC-5 (ECT)

El Pangui Canton is a canton of Ecuador, located in the Zamora-Chinchipe Province. Its capital is the town of El Pangui. Its population at the 2001 census was 7,441.
