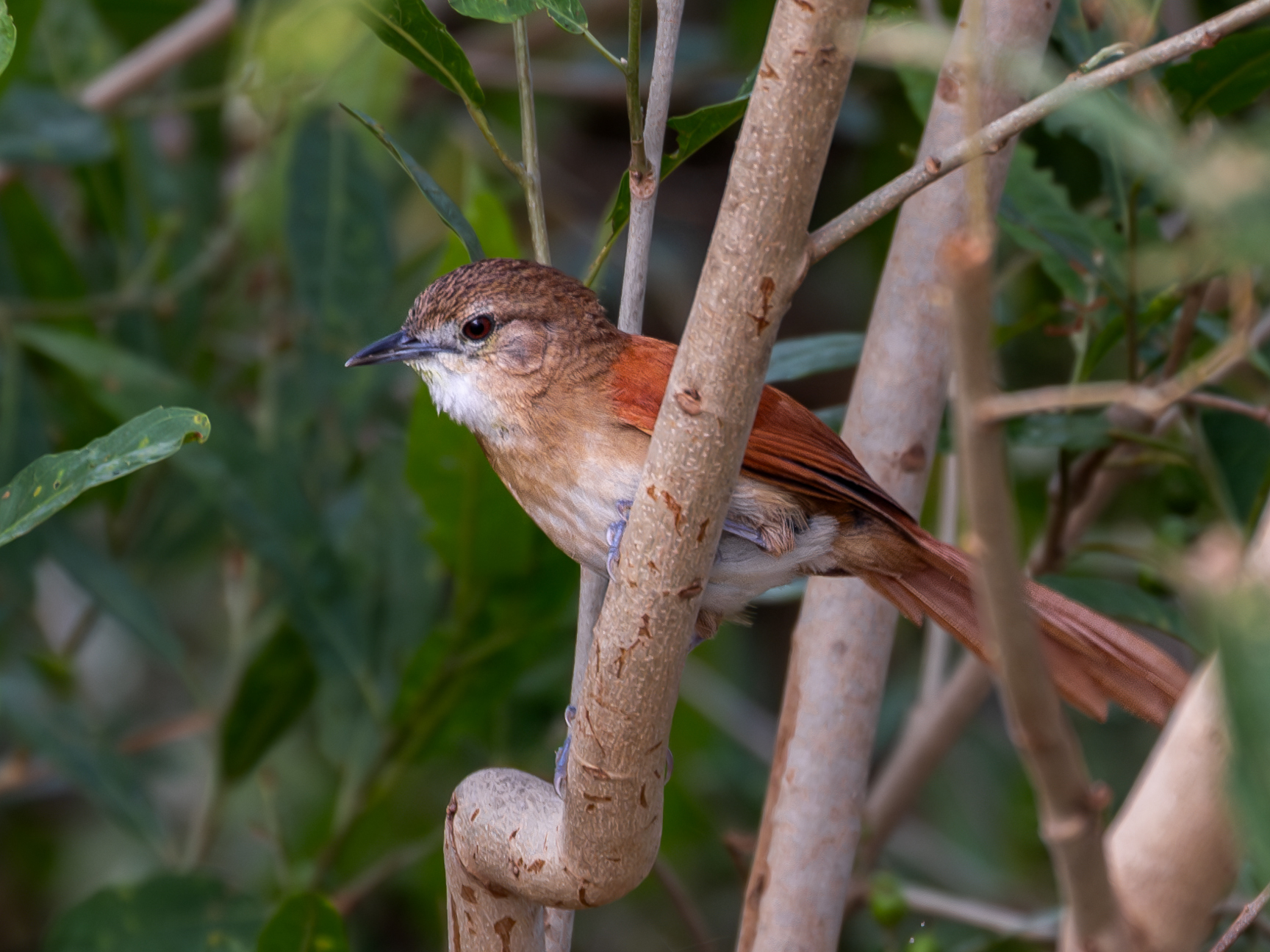

Conservation status
- Least Concern (IUCN 3.1)

Scientific classification
- Kingdom: Animalia
- Phylum: Chordata
- Class: Aves
- Order: Passeriformes
- Family: Furnariidae
- Genus: Synallaxis
- Species: S. simoni

Binomial name
- Synallaxis simoni Hellmayr, 1907

= Araguaia spinetail =

Species of bird in Brazil

The Araguaia spinetail (Synallaxis simoni) is a species of bird in the Furnariinae subfamily of the ovenbird family Furnariidae. It is endemic to Brazil.

== Taxonomy and systematics ==
The Araguaia spinetail has at times been treated as a subspecies of the white-lored spinetail (S. albilora), and both have also been treated as subspecies of the plain-crowned spinetail (S. gujanensis). Starting in 2016 with BirdLife International, taxonomists accepted it as a species in its own right. The International Ornithological Committee and the Clements taxonomy made the change in 2023. However, the South American Classification Committee of the American Ornithological Society has not done so.

The Araguaia spinetail is monotypic.

== Description ==
The Araguaia spinetail is 15 to 16 cm (5.9 to 6.3 in) long. The sexes have the same plumage. Adults have dull whitish lores on an otherwise brownish gray face. Their crown is grayish brown, their mantle, back, and rump bright rufous, and their uppertail coverts dark rufous. Their wings are bright rufous with fuscous-brown tips on the flight feathers. Their tail is dark rufous; it is graduated and the feathers have blunt tips. Their throat is white; their underparts are mostly tan with a whitish center on a paler belly. Their iris is cinnamon brown, their maxilla black to dark gray, their mandible gray, and their legs and feet gray to dull brownish.

== Distribution and habitat ==
The Araguaia spinetail is found in east-central Brazil along the Araguaia River and some of its tributaries, in northwestern Goiás, southwestern Tocantins, southeastern Pará, and northeastern Mato Grosso. It inhabits landscapes very near water including gallery forest, riparian woodland and scrublands, and river islands. It occurs below 1,000 m (3,300 ft) of elevation.

== Behavior ==
=== Movement ===
The Araguaia spinetail is a year-round resident.

=== Feeding ===
The Araguaia spinetail's diet has not been studied. It usually forages in pairs, in vines and tangles in the understorey, mostly up to about 2 m (7 ft) above the ground. It gleans its prey from foliage and small branches.

=== Breeding ===
The Araguaia spinetail's nest is a mass of sticks with a horizontal entrance tunnel placed near the ground in a shrub or small tree. Nothing else is known about its breeding biology.

=== Vocalization ===
The Araguaia spinetail's song is a "single nasal downslurred note keeeu, repeated at intervals of 1‒3 seconds". It also makes a "nasal single disyllabic note ki-eet". Both sexes sing. They sing mainly in the morning, and from a hidden perch in vegetation.

== Status ==
The IUCN has assessed the Araguaia spinetail as being of Least Concern. It has a very limited range and an unknown population size that is believed to be decreasing. Its principal threat is habitat loss through deforestation. It is considered fairly common "within its restricted range" and is protected in Cantão State Park. Brazilian authorities list it as Vulnerable.
