= Valladolid Parish =

Rural parish of the Palanda Canton, Ecuador

Coordinates: 4.5504°S 79.1327°W

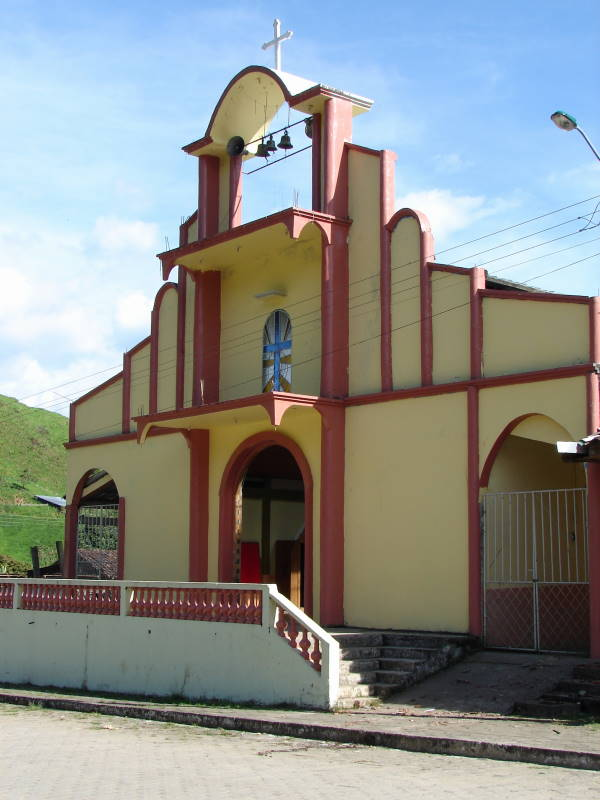
Valladolid church

Valladolid Parish is located in Palanda Canton in Ecuador.

This parish sits on the ruins of the old Spanish colonial city of Valladolid, founded in 1557, which later became the capital of the Yaguarzongo government . The old Valladolid suffered an uprising in 1576 that led to the destruction of the city. In 1932 new settlers began to migrate to the ruins and began re populating. Valladolid was elevated to the category of rural parish of Palanda in 1963. On September 1st of 1982, an Aerocondor DHC-4 Caribou crashed near the parish. All 44 people on board were killed.
