= 1982 Aerocondor DHC-4 Caribou accident =

1982 DHC-4 crash in the Andes

Accident
- Date: 1 September 1982
- Summary: CFIT in bad weather due to spatial disorientation
- Site: near Valladolid, Ecuador; 4.537825°S 79.174955°W

Aircraft
- Aircraft type: de Havilland Canada DHC-4 Caribou
- Operator: Aerolíneas Cóndor
- Registration: HC-BHZ
- Flight origin: Zumba Airport (SEZP), Ecuador
- Destination: Loja Airport (LOH/SELO), Ecuador
- Passengers: 41
- Crew: 3
- Fatalities: 44
- Survivors: 0

The 1982 Aerocondor DHC-4 Caribou accident occurred on 1 September 1982 when a twin-engined de Havilland Canada DHC-4 Caribou (registered in Ecuador as HC-BHZ) on an internal scheduled passenger flight operated by Aerolíneas Cóndor (Aerocondor) from Zumba Airport to Loja Airport collided with high ground in the Andes in bad weather. The terrain and weather hindered the search and rescue operations, and helicopters did not reach the accident site until 4 September 1982; all 44 on board were killed.

== Aircraft ==
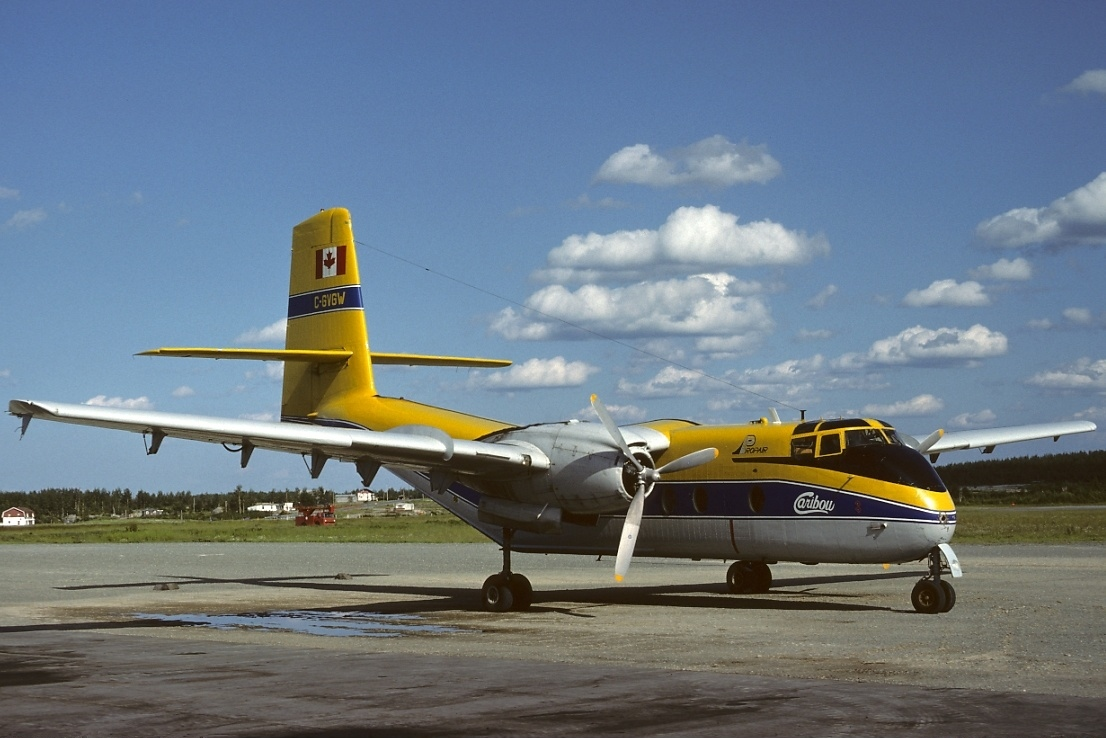
A Caribou similar to the accident aircraft

The aircraft was a de Havilland Canada DHC-4 Caribou twin-engined piston transport that had been built in Canada in 1967.
