= Nangaritza Canton =

Coordinates: 4°02′54″S 78°40′56″W

- Canton
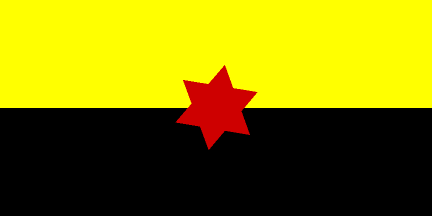
- Flag

- Location of Zamora Chinchipe Province in Ecuador.

- Cantons of Zamora Chinchipe Province
- Country: Ecuador
- Province: Zamora-Chinchipe Province
- Time zone: UTC-5 (ECT)

Nangaritza Canton is a canton of Ecuador, located in the Zamora-Chinchipe Province. Its capital is the town of Guayzimi. Its population at the 2001 census was 4,797.
