= Zamora Canton =

Zamora Canton Ciudad de Aves y Cascadas
- Canton
- Location of Zamora Chinchipe Province in Ecuador.

- Cantons of Zamora Chinchipe Province
- Coordinates: 4.12°S 78.80°W
- Country: Ecuador
- Province: Zamora-Chinchipe Province

Area
  - Total: 1,900 km^{2} (730 sq mi)
- Elevation: 899 m (2,949 ft)

Population (2022 census)
  - Total: 30,186
  - Density: 16/km^{2} (41/sq mi)
- Time zone: UTC-5 (ECT)
- Website: https://www.zamora.gob.ec/

Zamora is a canton in the Zamora-Chinchipe Province of Ecuador. It was named after Zamora city, the provincial capital and head of the canton of the same name.

== History ==
On October 11, 1911, the Zamora Canton was created in the great former Provincia de Oriente, later in 1921 it became part of the Santiago-Zamora Province and in 1953, it permanently became part of the actual province.

== General information ==
The canton is known for being one of the oldest and the largest canton in area of the province. It is surrounded by the remaining cantons, with exception of the Chinchipe, El Pangui and Paquisha cantons. To the west the canton borders with the Loja Province.

The Zamora Canton is the entrance from the Sierra Region towards the rest of the province by the Troncal Amazónica Highway, in a stretch of 62 kilometers from Loja city.

== Political division ==
The canton is divided in 7 parishes, to wit:

- Cumbaratza
- Guadalupe
- El Limón
- Imbana
- Sabanilla
- San Carlos
- Timbara
- Zamora
