= Pilar Zamora =

Spanish politician (born 1971)

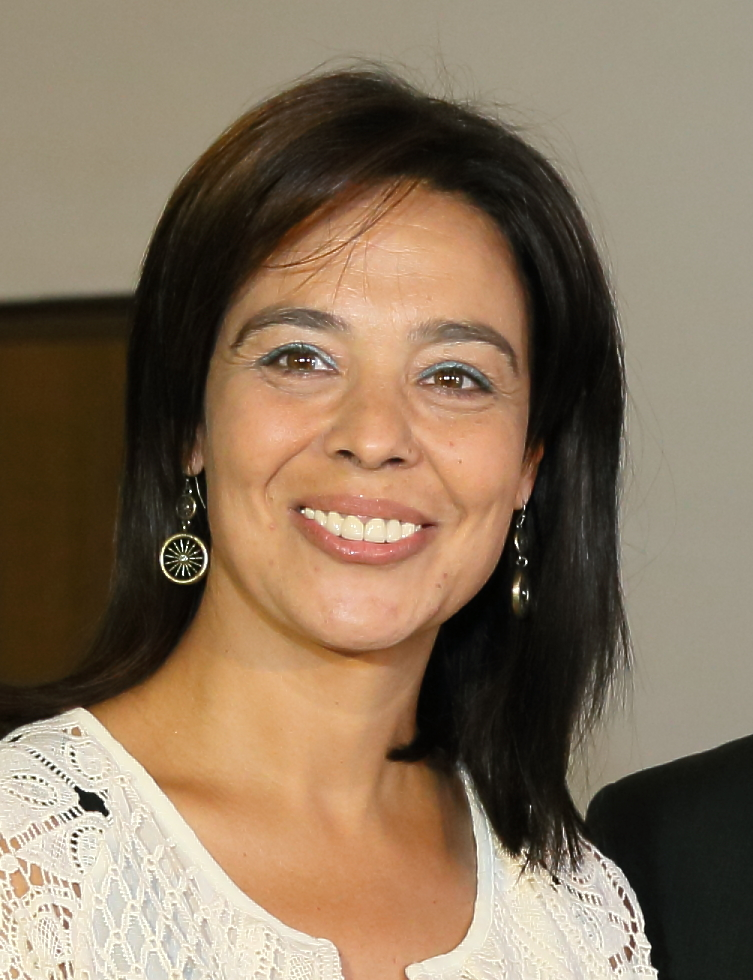
- Zamora in 2015

Member of the Senate
- Incumbent
- Assumed office 1 September 2023
- Appointed by: Cortes of Castilla–La Mancha

Personal details
- Born: 13 April 1971 (age 55)
- Party: Spanish Socialist Workers' Party

María del Pilar Zamora Bastante (born 13 April 1971) is a Spanish politician serving as a member of the Senate since 2023. From 2015 to 2021, she served as mayor of Ciudad Real.
