= Centinela del Cóndor Canton =

- Canton
- Location of Zamora Chinchipe Province in Ecuador.

- Cantons of Zamora Chinchipe Province
- Coordinates: 3.89491°S 78.78141°W
- Country: Ecuador
- Province: Zamora-Chinchipe Province
- Time zone: UTC-5 (ECT)

Centinela del Cóndor Canton is a canton of Ecuador, located in the Zamora-Chinchipe Province. Its capital is the town of Zumbi. Its population at the 2001 census was 7,230.
