= Zamor (artist) =

French painter (born 1951)

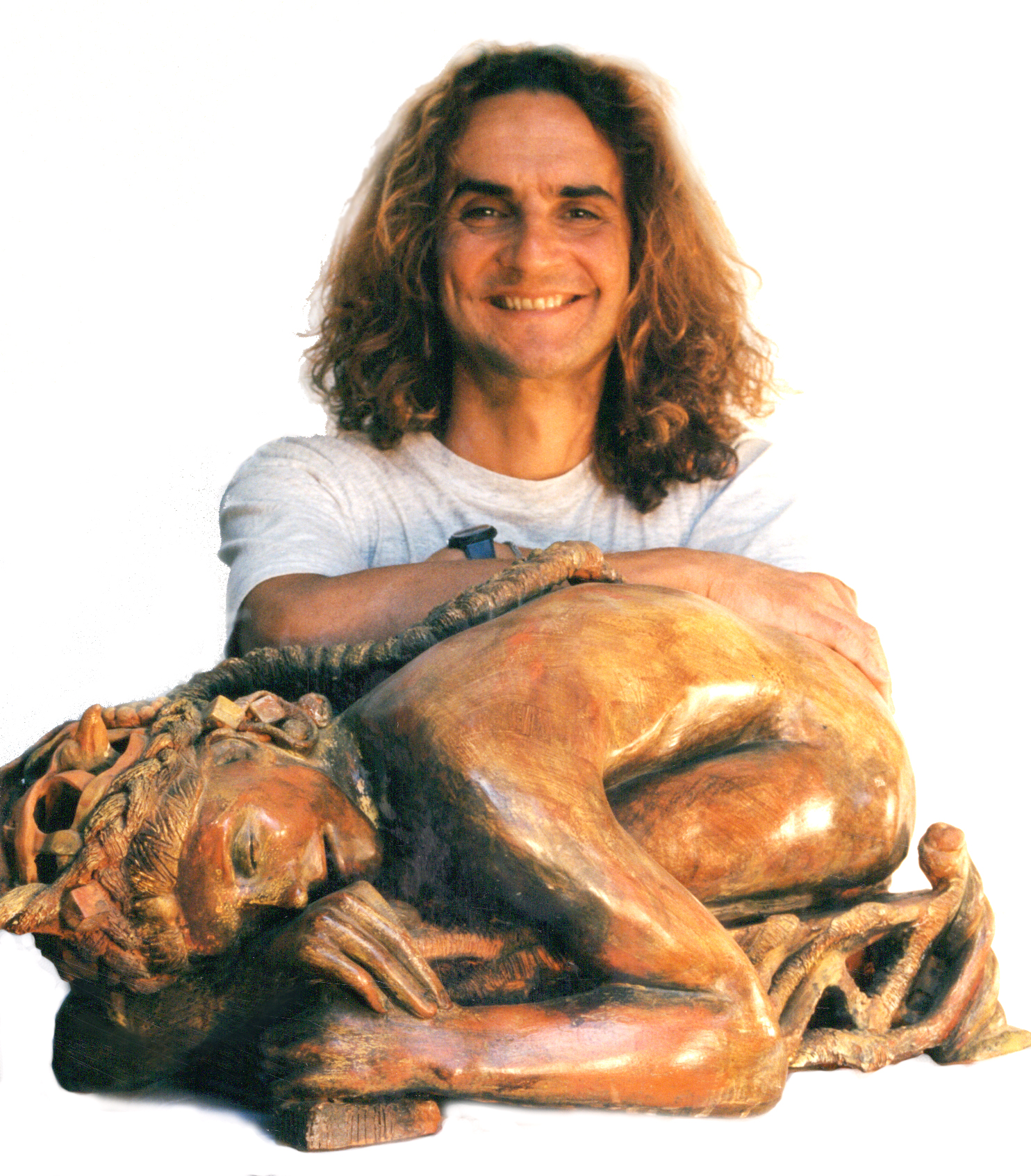
- Zamor in 1994
- Born: Guillermo Zamor; March 8, 1951; Cúcuta, Colombia
- Education: Universidad Javeriana; Université Sorbonne Paris IV
- Known for: Painter, sculptor, writer
- Notable work: The Black Christ (1980), Saint Jean Eudes(1989), Soberbio (2007)
- Movement: Suprarealism
- Website: http://www.zamor.com

Guillermo Zamor (born March 8, 1951), known as just Zamor, is a Colombian and French painter, sculptor and writer. He became known for his large paintings and the treatment of his male and female subjects using a technique between realism and hyperrealism.

Influenced by the Italian mannerists and their distorted figures, as well as anamorphosis and trompe-l'œil, his techniques borrow from the Renaissance. creating his own and unique style that he calls "suprarealism". The artist describes suprarealism as, "in surrealism the absurd elements are evident, but in suprarealism the absurd go into the logic of seeing, being in fact unnoticed". Zamor has lived in Europe since 1974, spending long periods in Rome, Florence, Paris, Amsterdam, Zürich, Stockholm and Madrid to develop and finish his humanistic studies before creating his own artistic style.

== Education ==
Once he had decided to be an artist, Zamor didn't want to study in the Academy of Arts, because he considered it a priority to have a humanistic and literary education in order to be better prepared for an artistic career. Initially he followed an architecture course at the Pontifical Xavierian University in Bogotá, Colombia, where he learned the fundamentals of art, perspective, drawing, etc. Then he decided to direct his studies towards philosophy and literature. He began with a licentiate degree in Philosophy and Letters and then a master's degree in history at the Xavierian University in Bogotá. After that he left his country to go to Paris in 1974 where he continued his humanistic studies for a master's degree in literature at the Sorbonne, and a Ph.D. in history, also at the Sorbonne, and finally, a licentiate degree in History of Art at the University of Grenoble in France. In 1976, after traveling and studying the Europe's museums, he decided to dedicate his life to painting and sculpting in Paris.

== Exhibitions ==
=== In France, 1970s ===
Zamor's first exhibition was in 1978 in Grenoble. From the beginning he attracted some press attention. His personal style was inspired from men and women nudes, Critics also recognized his practice of a very classical technique in oil paintings. A series of individual exhibitions in the Galerie Madeleine, Grenoble, 1979, was followed by exhibitions at the Galerie d'Art Moderne, Orange, and the Galerie du Musée, Nernier, France.

In 1980 journalists from the Rhône-Alpes region chose Zamor to represent the region in the 91st Independents Salon in the Grand Palais in Paris.

=== In Venezuela and Colombia ===
After this initial success as an artist in France, Zamor returned to Colombia in 1979. Soon after he arrived he opened a studio and started painting "Saint Sebastian", inspired by a model he met. Initially planning to stay for three months, he remained a year and a half, taking the opportunity to exhibit in different places. The first was in Cúcuta, in the "Culture house", and then in Venezuela, in San Cristobal, at the Galerie J.M. Oliveros.

In 1980 he met Gustavo Humberto Rodríguez, Colombian presidential council, who invited him to hold an individual exhibition in San Carlos House, previously the Presidential house, in January 1981. The same exhibition was immediately claimed by the Contemporary Art Museum. The national press from Colombia discovered a new artist. At the end of 1981, Zamor returned to Paris leaving all his works from the previous two years in the Contemporary Art Museum's depository.

=== Press releases in 1980s ===
Back from Colombia, Zamor stayed in Paris. For one year and a half he studied systematically the art works in the Louvre Museum using his historical background. He then moved to Grenoble, where the Mayor of Grenoble gives him a place to set up his art Studio. Here he developed his style introducing new elements in his drawings and paintings, especially the anamorphosis and the trompe-l'œil. In 1985 Zamor held another exhibition in the Theatre of Grenoble centered on one canvas with all the related drawings and studies around it.
The Art critic and History of Art teacher in Florence (Italy) and in Grenoble (France), Philippe Renard, invite Zamor to La Pieve an Elici, in Lucca, Italy, to get know him better and later on published an interview for the magazine Connaissances des Hommes in Paris in 1985. The Greek translation were published in the literary magazine ΠΟΔΙΟΡΚ'ΙΑ, appeared in Athens in 1985.

In 1986 The Eolia's Gallery, 10 rue de Seine in Paris, discovered Zamor's work and takes him under exclusivity. It organize different exhibitions of Zamor's drawings which generated a lively interest in the French press: the arts magazine L'Œil the newspaper Le Figaro, the weekly Le Point and in the Art's Anthology book written by the Art critics Gérard Xuriguera. On April 24, 1988, some of his works were sold at the Salle Drouot auction house "Cabinet Catherine Charbonneaux" in Paris.

=== Travels in 1990s ===
Zamor travel and works a lot, founding inspiration in new places. From Ardèche to Paris, then to Grenoble, then changing continents and living on the shores of the tropical sea. After this he moved to the countryside and the great hills of the Cordillera of the Andes and to Porto Rico. Wherever he ended up there were new possibilities for exhibitions. At Bogotá, in Colombia, he exhibited at the "Galerie d'Art" in the World Trade Center in 1991 and 1992 another exhibition followed in Barranquilla, Colombia, in December 1992. In 1993 he stayed the whole year in Cartagena, Colombia, and from the end of 1993 to May 1996 on the high plateau of the Cordillera. After his return to France he was invited to exhibit his art works in San Juan de Puerto Rico, in 1997 and again in 2000 with Carolina Herrera.

=== Style ===
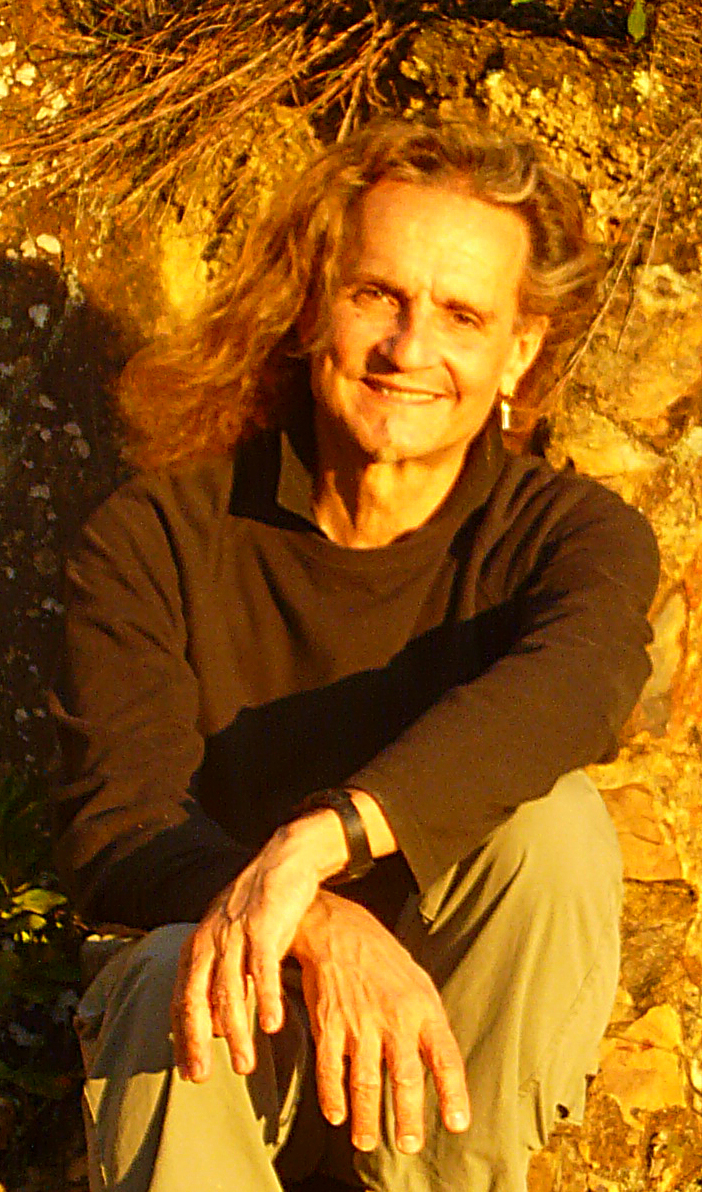
Zamor in 2011.

The best way to describe the Zamor Style may be through excerpts of press reviews. Right from the start it has been said that Zamor "... show us a world erotic as well as fantastic and terribly smooth, through meanders where human bodies express the most eclectics emotions "... and across the Atlantic it was said that Zamor's approach: "... is absolutely contemporary... his artistic vision is inspired by classicals lines, and his picture are deeply anchored in the Greek culture and philosophy..."

Back in France one could read "... The beautiful drawing of Zamor ... of such quality that it is to be hoped that the talent of the artist will be more widely recognized". and going back to the source of his inspiration it was said: "…his researches related his art to the great era of Mannerism. He give us the certainty that modern plastic Art – to quote Rodin -: 'An Art worthy of that name does not follow the past, he extends it'".

About his artwork's poetry, "… Zamor surprises us with drawings of an aerial musicality, singing under his pencil and leaving them vibrating…" and about his quality "...Sofia Vari and Zamor who are experienced designers ..." In Paris well-known journalists confirmed his talent:"... Zamor, the Colombian who became a citizen of Grenoble, also excites us with imagery using draped bodies and pediments which are drawn so carefully and so monumentally that it makes you feel dizzy..." and "... Zamor is sure of his ways: he fashions, with an imaginary futurism, more likelihood than similarity ..." ..." mentioned in the book of artistic anthology by Xuriguera.

Later Zamor integrated a new element in his pictures: trompe-l'œil which was quickly rewarded by the critics: "... his works in acrylics possess an illusionist magic, achieved by the trompe-l'œil technique combined with expertly drawn nudes... ". This was almost immediately confirmed in France by Sylvie Perrard: "... His work expresses the constant interplay between dream and reality ..."

The following review referred to his portraits: "Through his paintings, the artist Zamor interprets the soul, the inside of each person… No one knows where the picture ends and the frame begins…"

=== Public collections ===
When Zamor was working with the Eolia Galery in Paris it put his artworks in auction sales in Drouot, Paris in April 1988. At the same time in Colombia, the corporation "El Minuto de Dios2 from Eudists community commissioned from him a picture of "Saint Jean Eudes" for the Contemporary Arts Museum in Bogotá; the Colombian President, Belisario Betancur, asked Zamor for "The Black Christ" to be part of the Betancur Collection, in the Presidential "Nariño's House" from Colombia, along with Botero and other Colombian painters. Other artworks are in public collections, such as "Eve" in the "Museo de la Memoria", in Cucuta, Colombia, some drawings bought for the Avianca Collection, open to the public.

== Writings and publications ==
=== Historical writings ===
Historical essays by Zamor were published at the Universitas Humanísticas Revue from the Xavierian University, in Bogotá, Colombia, different studies between 1971 and 1974 :

Elementos decorativos del arte Muisca en los volantes de huso (50 pages).

Others, based on original paleographic documents from the 16th century, conserved in the Colombian National Archives: Catálogo de documentos existentes en el Archivo Histórico Nacional para el período 1564 – 1580 (80 pages); Ordenanças del Señor Doctor Antonio Gonzalez y del Señor Miguel de Ybarra (20 pages); Catálogo de documentos existentes en el Archivo Histórico Nacional para el período 1580- 1597 (110 pages); Encomiendas en el Nuevo Reino de Granada durante el período presidencial del Doctor Antonio Gonzalez (1590–1597) (100 pages); Catálogo de documentos existentes en el Archivo Histórico Nacional para el período 1597 – 1605 (90 pages);

In addition he wrote a chapter about the history of the city of his birth, El sitio de Cucuta 1900–1903, published by the Institute of Culture and Arts from Cúcuta (50 pages).

Zamor stopped historical writings in 1976 in order to devote himself exclusively to his artistic projects.

=== Philosophical writings ===
With the arrival of the Internet, Zamor taught himself information technology, in order to put on line the whole collection of his works. From 1998 to 2004 he developed his website www.zamor.com. In 2011 he created www.zamor.fr, in order to publish his books, written simultaneously with his career as a painter.

Le Quêteur d'âmes ("The Seeker of Souls"), a philosophical and biographical essay in French (640 pages, 1999–2004) was the first published, followed by another philosophical essay in French entitled, L'être Sensible ou Lettres sans cible aux êtres sensibles ("The Sensitive being", "Letters without target for sensitive beings") (285 pages, 2010–2011).

Next in 2013 he published a novel which continues the subject of "The Seeker of Souls", but in a different literary style entitled À l'ombre des manguiers ("In the shadow of the mango trees") (285 pages, 2002–2005)).

In 2015, another philosophical essay was published in French (200 pages, 2014) entitled À la recherche de ma complétude ("In search of my completeness").

== Zamor’s museum & foundation ==
Created in 2014 in order to work with sensitive beings and to work towards the realization of the Zamor Museum, with more than one thousand artworks from his own collection.

Since 2000 Zamor no longer sells his artworks, and from 1976 onwards has kept as many as he could.
