= Pedro Zamora Álvarez =

Guatemalan trade unionist

- Born: 1964; Guatemala
- Died: January 15, 2007 (aged 42–43); Guatemala
- Occupation: Trade unionist

Pedro Zamora Álvarez (1964 – 15 January 2007) was a Guatemalan trade unionist.

At the time of his death, he was the general secretary of the Sindicato de Trabajadores de la Empresa Portuaria Quetzal (the Puerto Quetzal Dockers' Union, or STEPQ, an affiliate of the International Transport Workers' Federation).

He was gunned down in the vicinity of Puerto Quetzal on 15 January 2007, in an attack in which his pick-up truck was riddled with 100 bullets and one of his children was also injured; he and other leaders of the union had received frequent anonymous death threats in the preceding months.
