= Jaén District =

Coordinates: 5.7142°S 78.8116°W

Jaén
- District
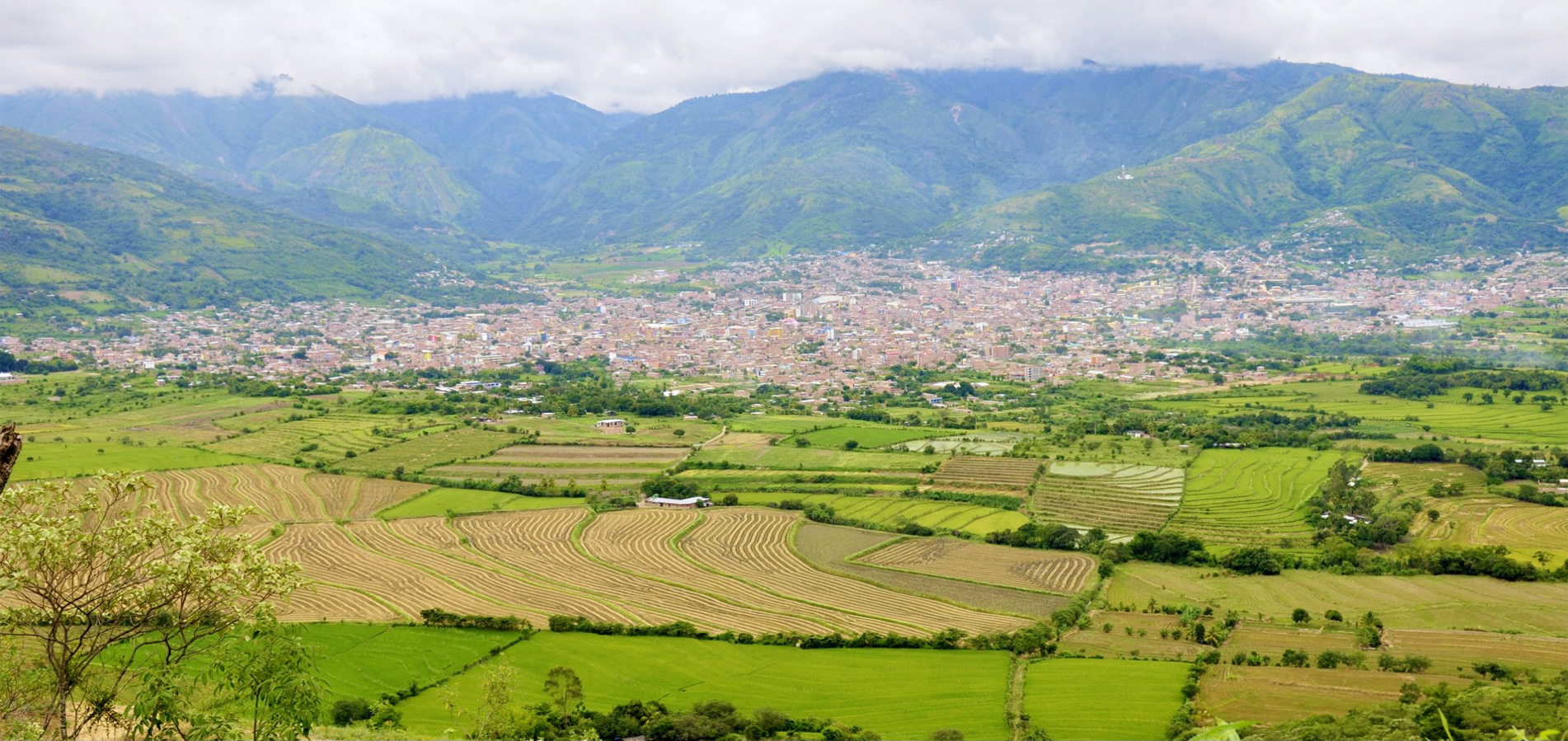
- Interactive map of Jaén
- Country: Peru
- Region: Cajamarca
- Province: Jaén
- Named for: Jaén, Spain
- Capital: Jaén

Government
  - Mayor: José Francisco Delgado Rivera (2019-2022)

Area
  - Total: 537.25 km^{2} (207.43 sq mi)
- Elevation: 729 m (2,392 ft)

Population (2005 census)
  - Total: 79,883
  - Density: 148.69/km^{2} (385.10/sq mi)
- Time zone: UTC-5 (PET)
- UBIGEO: 060801

Jaén District is one of twelve districts of the province Jaén in Peru.

== See also ==
- Montegrande (archaeological site)
