= Zamora River =

River of Ecuador

Coordinates: 4.000°S 78.87°W

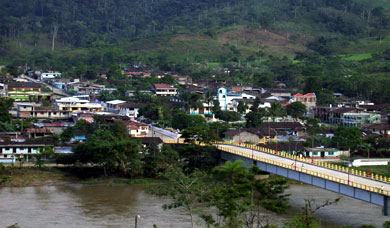
- Zamora River in Zumbi Parish, Centinela del Cóndor Canton

Location
- Country: Ecuador

The Zamora River (Spanish: Río Zamora) is a tributary of the Santiago River located in the south-east of Ecuador. Historically, it was known to the Spanish as Yaya Mayu ("Father River"), from the river's name among a group of Shuar encountered nearby.

The sources of the Zamora River are in the Podocarpus National Park, specifically at the Nudo de Cajanuma. The river then descends towards the city of Loja. It crosses the provinces of Loja, Zamora-Chinchipe (wherein lies the city of Zamora) and Morona-Santiago, where it empties into the Santiago.

== Tributaries ==
The Zamora is the dominant river in southeastern Ecuador, and has many tributaries.

The most significant tributaries by province include:

Loja Province

- Malacatos River
- Jipiro River
- Zamora Huayco River

Zamora-Chinchipe Province

- Tambo Blanco River
- San Francisco River
- Sabanilla River
- Bombuscaro River
- Jamboé River
- Nambija River
- Yacuambi River
- Chicaña River
- Nangaritza River
- Pachicutza River
- Chuchumbletza River

Morona-Santiago Province

- Bomboiza River
- Bobonaza River

== See also ==
- Rivers of Ecuador
