= Palanda Canton =

- Canton
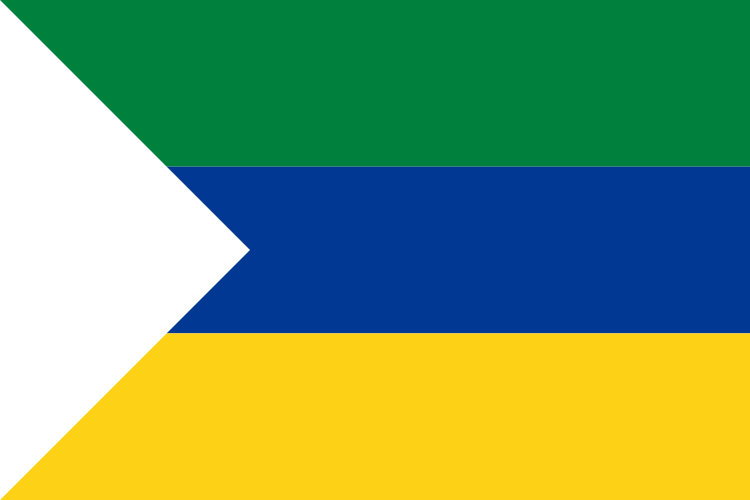
- Flag

- Location of Zamora Chinchipe Province in Ecuador.

- Cantons of Zamora Chinchipe Province
- Coordinates: 4.6498°S 79.1321°W
- Country: Ecuador
- Province: Zamora-Chinchipe Province
- Capital: Palanda
- Time zone: UTC-5 (ECT)

Palanda Canton is a canton of Ecuador, located in the Zamora-Chinchipe Province. Its capital is the town of Palanda. Its population at the 2001 census was 7,066.

== History ==
This canton has a long history, from the earliest known humans occupation to one of the latest inca battle, just before the colonial time.

== Parishes ==
The canton is administratively divided into 4 parishes

- Vergel
- Palanda
- El Porvenir
- Valladolid

== Archaeology ==
The site of Santa Ana (La Florida) is located just to the north of Palanda. This is an important archaeological site going back as early as 3,500 BC.

The work in this area was started in 2002 by a team of French and Ecuadoran archaeologists.

== Bibliography ==
- Human settlements already existed in the Amazon Basin (Ecuador) 4000 years ago. 12-May-2004 eurekalert.org
- Valdez, Francisco. “Inter-zonal relationships in Ecuador”, en Handbook of South American Archaeology, Helaine Silverman y William Isbell eds., Springer, pp. 865–891, 2008
- Valdez, Francisco; Jean Gufroy; Geoffroy de Saulieu; Julio Hurtado; Alexandra Yépez (2005), Découverte d’un site cérémoniel formatif sur le versant oriental des Andes Proyecto Zamora Chinchipe
