= Zamora-Chinchipe Province =

Province of Ecuador

Zamora Chinchipe
- Province
- Province of Zamora Chinchipe
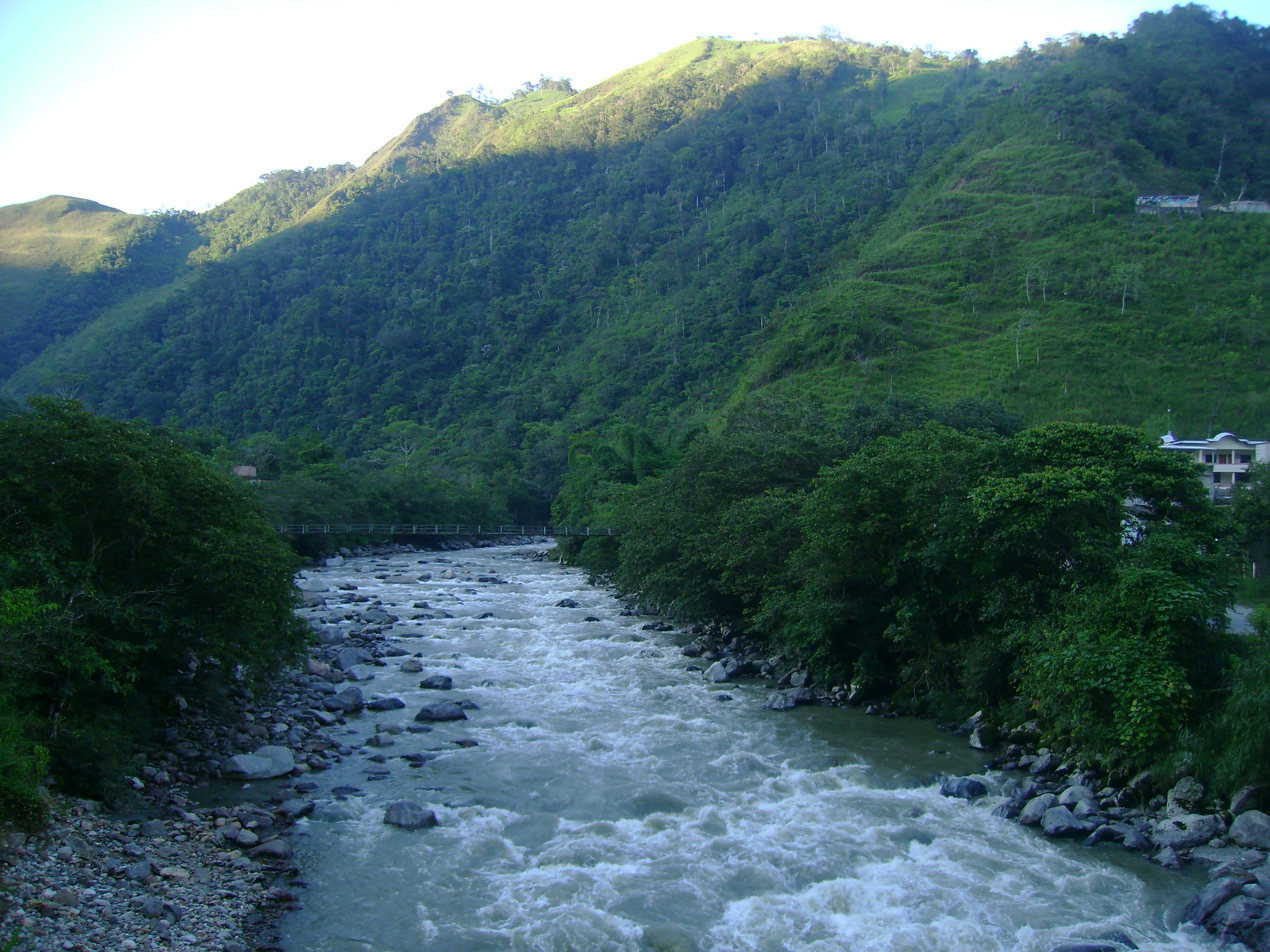
- A picture token of the Zamora River.

- Flag

- Location of Zamora Chinchipe in Ecuador

- Cantons of Zamora Chinchipe Province
- Coordinates: 4°05′54.2″S 78°52′40.2″W
- Country: Ecuador
- Established: November 10, 1953
- Capital: Zamora
- Cantons: List of Cantons: Centinela del Cóndor; Chinchipe; El Pangui; Nangaritza; Palanda; Paquisha; Yacuambi; Yantzaza; Zamora

Government
  - Prefect: Karla Reátegui (MUPP)
  - Vice Prefect: Víctor Sarango
  - Governor: Ivonne Panchi

Area
  - Total: 10,559 km^{2} (4,077 sq mi)

Population (2022 census)
  - Total: 110,973
  - Density: 10.510/km^{2} (27.220/sq mi)
- Time zone: UTC-05 (ECT)
- Vehicle registration: Z
- HDI (2022): 0.799 high · 5th

Zamora Chinchipe (Spanish pronunciation: [saˈmoɾa tʃinˈtʃipe]), Province of Zamora Chinchipe is a province of the Republic of Ecuador, located at the southeastern end of the Amazon Basin, which shares borders with the Ecuadorian provinces of Azuay and Morona Santiago to the north, Loja and Azuay to the west, and with Peru to the east and south. The province comprises an area of approximately 10,559 km^{2} (4,077 sq mi) and is covered with a uniquely mountainous topography which markedly distinguishes it from the surrounding Amazonian provinces. Zamora-Chinchipe is characterized and largely identified by its mining industry; indigenous ethnic groups with a rich archaeological legacy; its biodiversity; and its niche and tourist attractions, which include a number of waterfalls well-noted for their beauty. The province takes its name from the administrative fusion of the Zamora and Chinchipe cantons. The provincial capital is the city of Zamora.

== History ==
Human habitation in the region is thought to date to at least 4500 BCE, and was grounded in the Mayo-Chinchipe cultural complex. In approximately 1548, Spaniards made their first contact with the region's indigenous people. On October 4, 1549, Hernando de Barahona, accompanied by Alonso de Mercadillo and Hernando de Benavente, founded the city of Zamora de los Alcaides. Fifty years after their arrival, the Spanish were driven from the city by the Shuar revolt. In 1850, the Zamora de los Alcaides city ruins were discovered by a group of colonists. It cannot be established exactly when the first white and mixed race settlers arrived in the province, but the oldest verifiable data shows that in the late 1840s, the Chinchipe River basin was already inhabited by people arriving from the Loja Province of modern Ecuador and Peru. The migration was also made from the Ecuadorian Province of Azuay to the Yacuambi Canton, where the Saraguros and mixed race people arrived. During the Spanish Colonial period, several explorers surveyed the territory, such as the French geographer and mathematician Charles Marie de La Condamine in a 1743 expedition. In 1781, the Spanish made a second attempt at colonization in the area, lured by the exploitation of gold deposits, but they found it impossible to dominate the natives.

The current settlement known as Zamora was not permanently reestablished by white and mixed race settlers until March 12, 1921, when the Catholic church founded the Apostolic Vicariate of Zamora, after many prior attempts at colonization, each repelled by the resistance of the Shuar people. In 1911, the Zamora parish became cantonal head of the Zamora Canton of the Provincia de Oriente. On December 15, 1920, the Santiago-Zamora Province was created. It consisted of the Chinchipe, Macas, Morona and Zamora cantons. The Chinchipe and Zamora cantons were each constituted by three parishes. On January 5, 1921, the Yacuambi Canton was created for the Santiago-Zamora Province.

On July 5, 1941, Ecuador was invaded by Peru, with part of the unpopulated territory of the province in contention. A ceasefire was brokered between the Foreign Ministers of Peru and Ecuador (with the participation of the United States, Brazil, Chile, and Argentina as "guarantors") capped with the signing of the Rio Protocol. The treaty officially brought an end to the state of war which had existed between Ecuador and Peru, and left part of the Ecuadorian provinces of El Oro, Loja, and Zamora-Chinchipe under Peruvian occupation. After the 1941 war, forced migration of impoverished peasants and citizens to the province was accelerated by drought in Loja Province, resulting in colonization of many areas of the Zamora-Chinchipe territory which had been theretofore uninhabited. The creation of the Zamora-Chinchipe Province was a twelve-year process which was due, in large part, to the indefatigable efforts of one Benjamin Carrión, a citizen of the Ecuadorian province of Loja, and, on November 10, 1953, Zamora-Chinchipe was designated an autonomous province, being separated from the Santiago-Zamora Province by means of a legal term issued in the Ecuadorian Official Registry No. 360.

In 1981, the tensions with Peru were rekindled by a military confrontation over the Cenepa River in the Cordillera del Cóndor. The conflict was centered in the Paquisha, Mayaycu and Manchinaza localities. By 1995 the conflict had reemerged, and in 1999 the signing of the Peace Agreement between Ecuador and Peru settled the contours of Zamora-Chinchipe's borders with its southern neighbor.

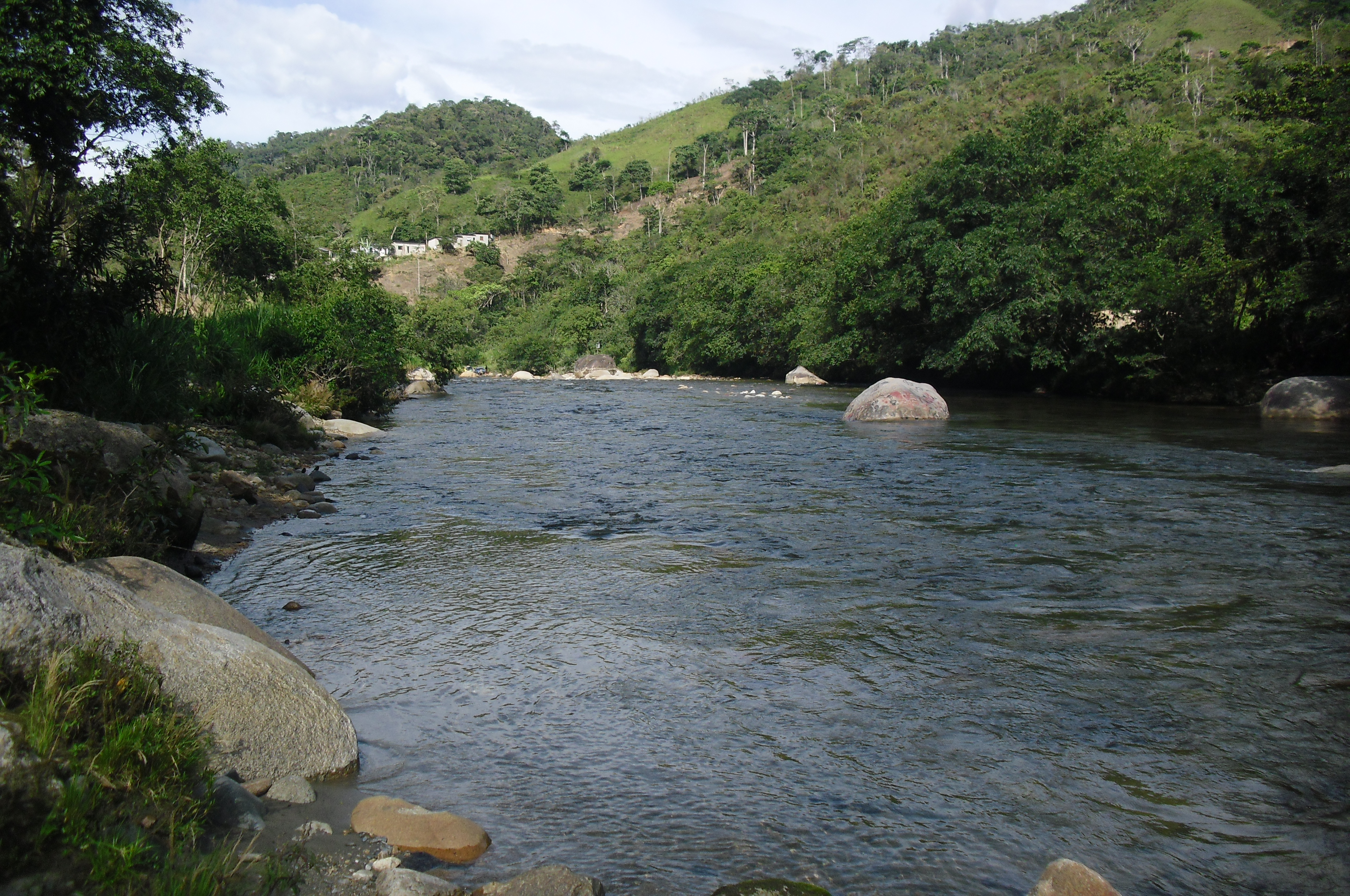
River Bombuscaro Las Ballenas, January 23, 2011

== Demographics ==
Ethnic groups as of the Ecuadorian census of 2010:

- Mestizo 80.3%
- Indigenous 15.6%
- White 2.1%
- Afro-Ecuadorian 1.4%
- Montubio 0.2%
- Other 0.4%

== Political division ==
The province is divided into nine cantons. The following table lists each with its population at the 2001 census, its area in square kilometres (km^{2}), and the name of the canton seat or capital.

Canton	Pop. (2001)	Area (km^{2})	Seat/Capital
Centinela del Cóndor	7,230	519	Zumbi
Chinchipe	8,495	1,194	Zumba
El Pangui	7,441	614	El Pangui
Nangaritza	4,797	2,096	Guayzimi (Nangaritza)
Palanda	7,066	1,925	Palanda
Paquisha			Paquisha
Yacuambi	5,229	1,242	Yacuambi
Yantzaza	14,552	990	Yantzaza
Zamora	21,791	1,876	Zamora

== See also ==
- Pachamama Raymi
- Podocarpus National Park
- Provinces of Ecuador
- Cantons of Ecuador
