= Zamora, Ecuador =

Zamora
- City
- Zamora de los Alcaides
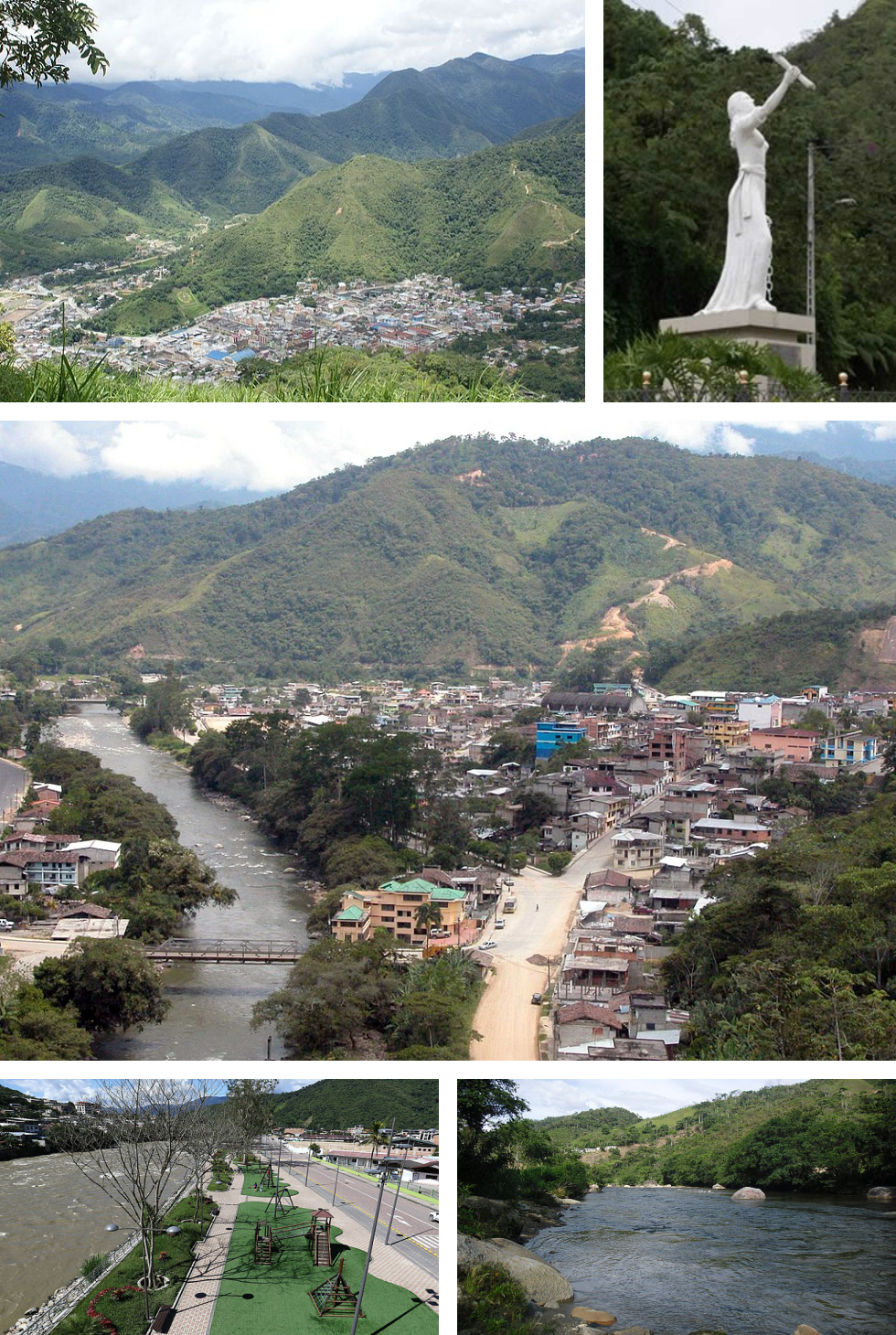
- From top, left to right: Panoramic view of the city, monument to Naya or La Chapetona, downtown, Linear Park of Zamora and Bombuscaro river.

- Flag
- Nicknames: City of Birds and Waterfalls
- Location within Ecuador
- Coordinates: 04°04′09″S 78°57′24″W
- Country: Ecuador
- Province: Zamora-Chincipe
- Canton: Zamora Canton
- Founded: October 4, 1549

Government
  - Governing body: Municipality of Zamora
  - Mayor: Víctor Manuel González Salinas

Area
  - City: 6.23 km^{2} (2.41 sq mi)
- Elevation: 970 m (3,180 ft)

Population (2022 census)
  - City: 17,584
  - Density: 2,820/km^{2} (7,310/sq mi)
- Demonym: Zamorano(-a)
- Time zone: UTC-5 (ECT)
- Climate: Af
- Website: www.zamora.gob.ec (in Spanish)

Zamora (Spanish pronunciation: [saˈmoɾa]) is a city in southeastern Ecuador; it is the capital of Zamora-Chinchipe province and the seat of Zamora Canton. Zamora is the principal and most populous city in Zamora-Chinchipe. It is located in the Oriente region at the base of the eastern portion of the Andes mountains in Ecuador, at 970 m above sea level, at the convergence of the Zamora, Bombuscaro and Jamboé rivers.

Zamora, which has experienced a boom in growth in since the recent discovery of gold in the surrounding region, is known as the "Mining Capital of Ecuador'", and as the "City of Birds and Waterfalls'", referring to the presence of various species of birds and several waterfalls on the streams that surround the city.

The city stretches from west to east towards Cumbaratza. It is connected by several bus and coach trips to other cantons and provinces.
