= Bagua, Peru =

Bagua Chica San Pedro de Bagua Chico
- Town
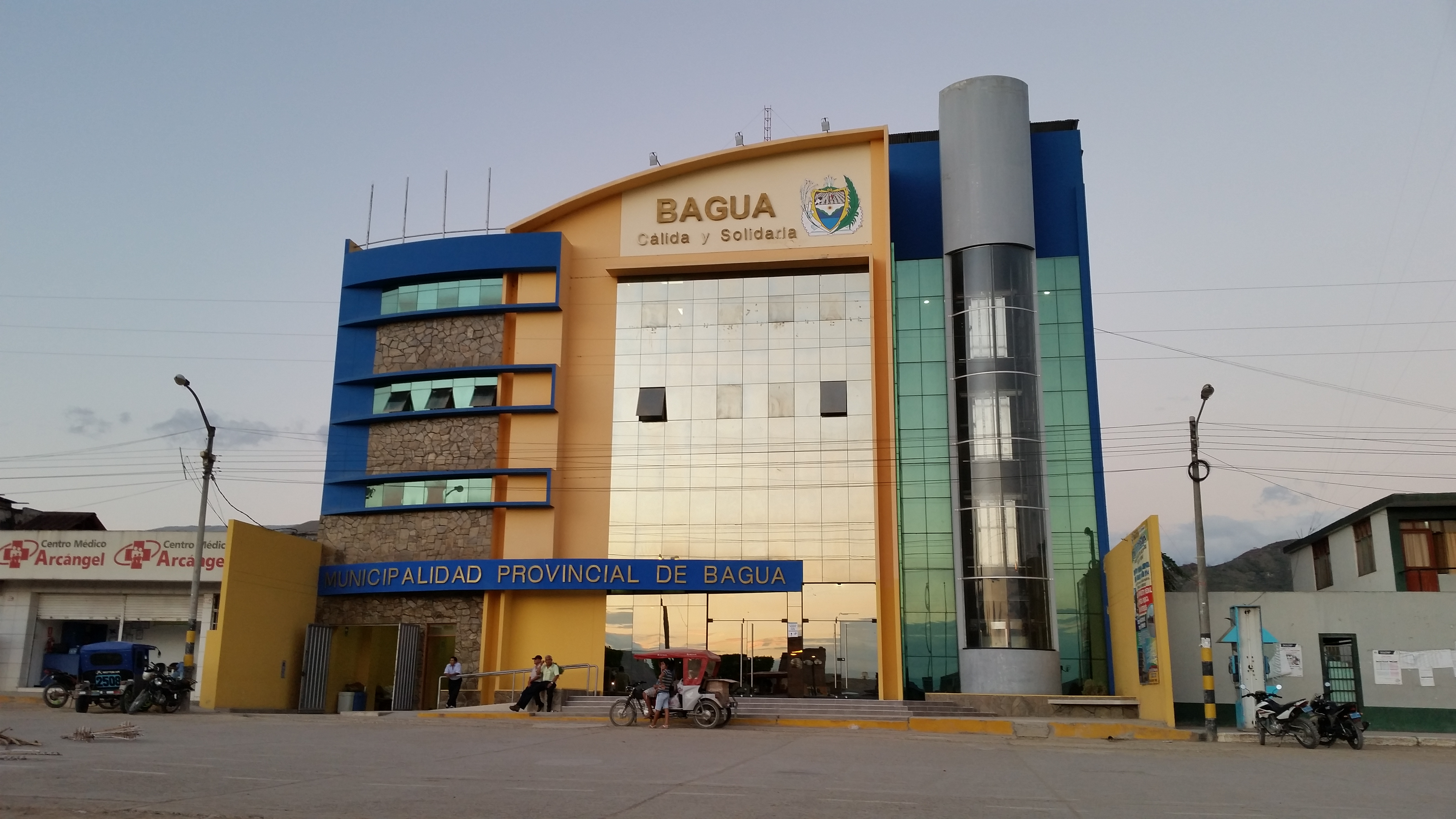
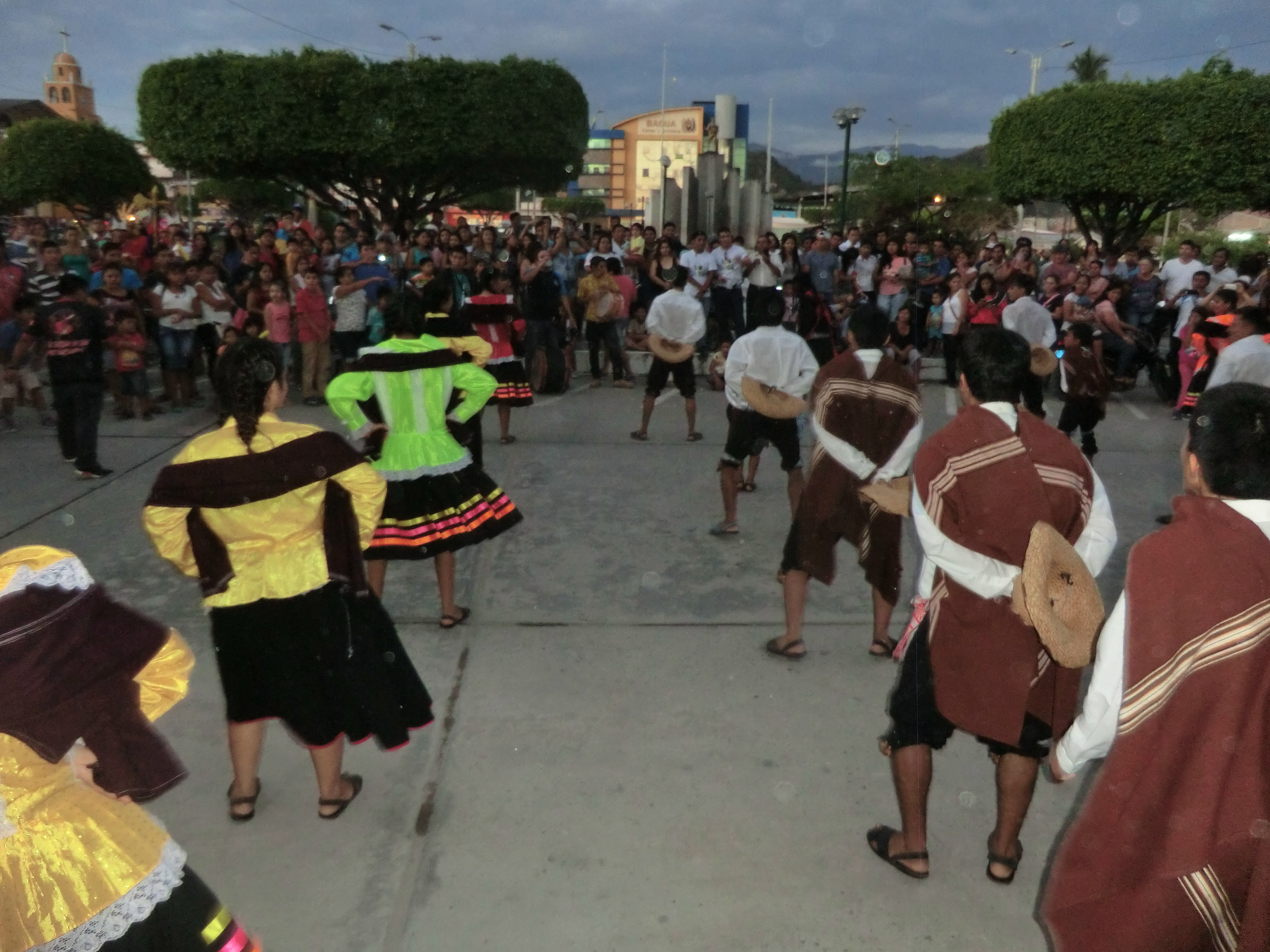
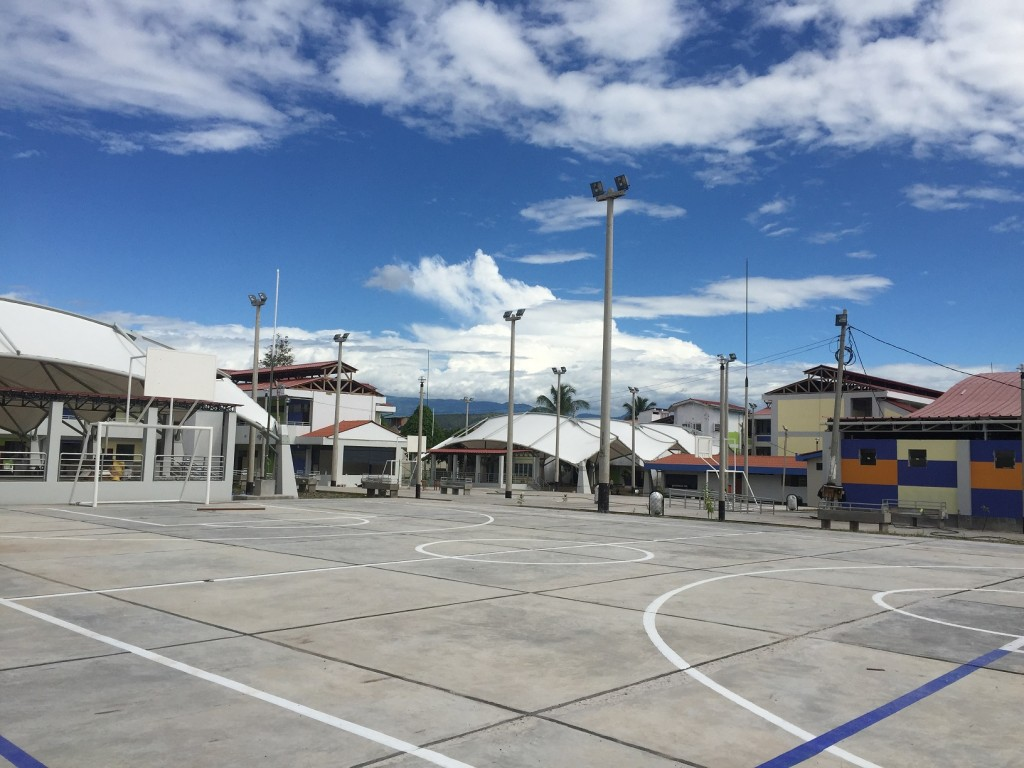
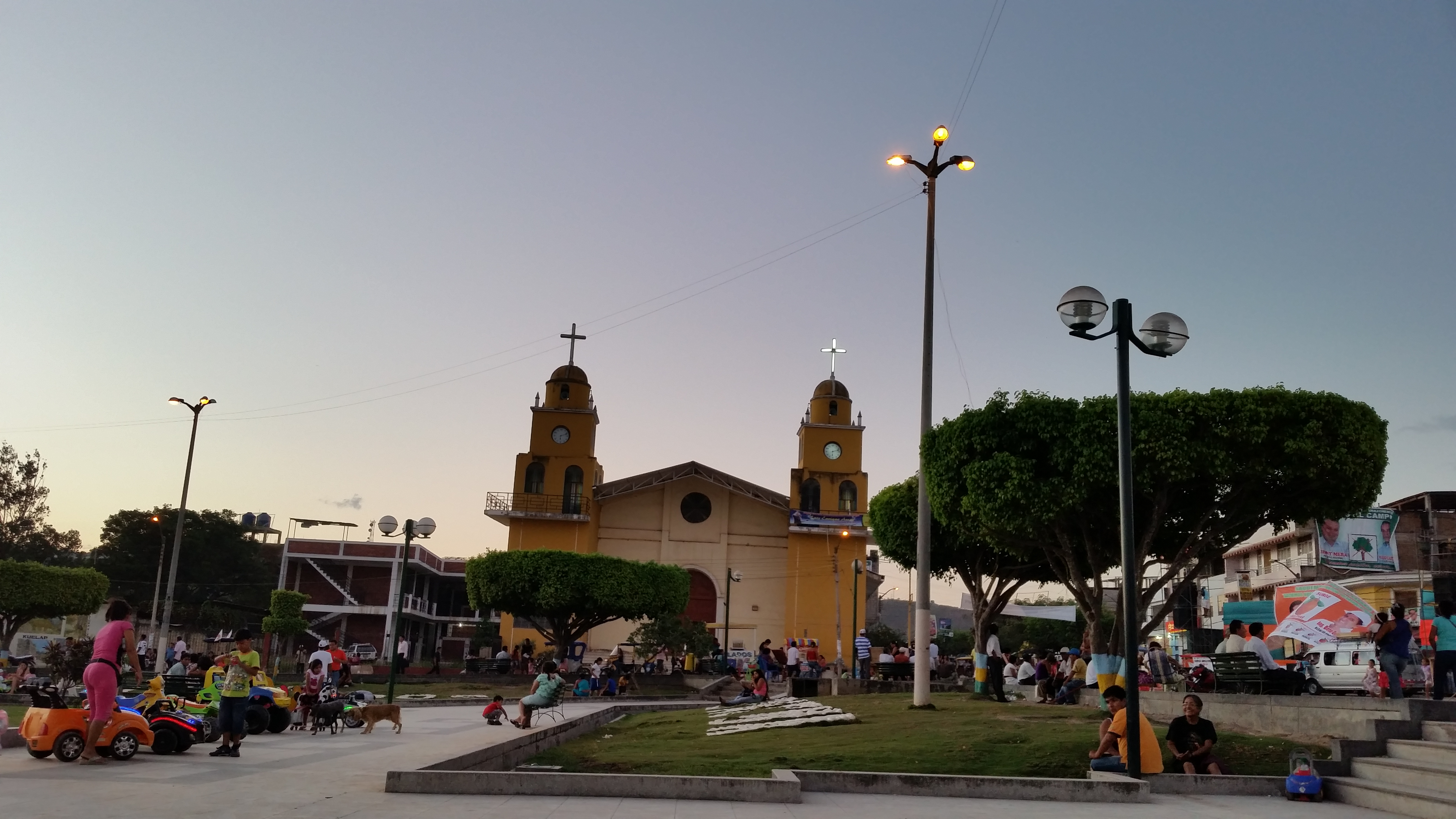
- Main Square

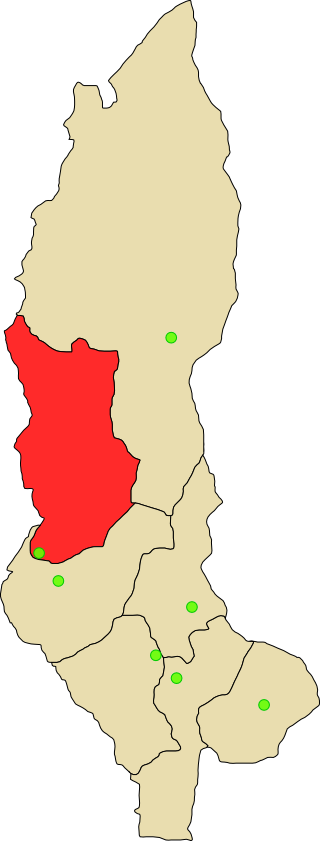

- Location within Peru
- Coordinates: 5°38′S 78°32′W
- Country: Peru
- Region: Amazonas Region
- Province: Bagua Province

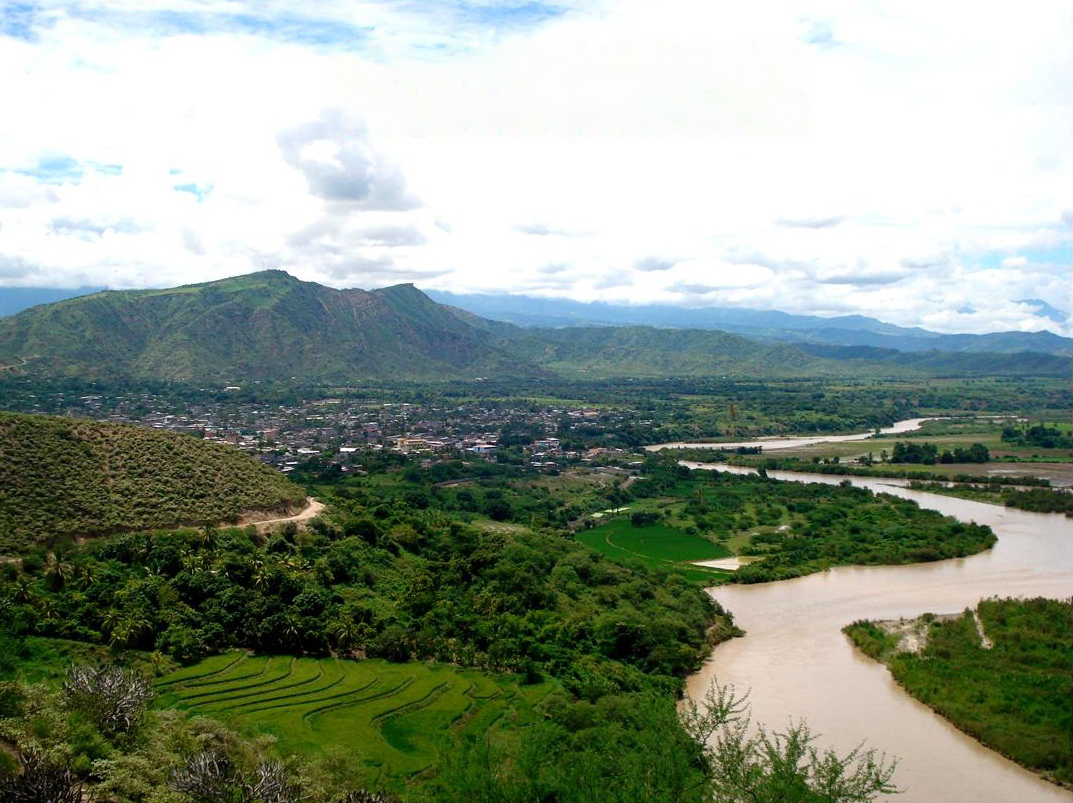
Bagua

Bagua, founded as San Pedro de Bagua Chico in 1561, is a city in Peru located about 162 kilometres (101 mi) from the city of Chachapoyas. It lies in the province of the same name.

== See also ==
- 2005 northern Peru earthquake
- 2009 Peruvian political crisis
