= Tabaconas Namballe National Sanctuary =

Conservation area in Peru

- Santuario Nacional Tabaconas-Namballe
- IUCN category III (natural monument or feature)
- Location within Peru
- Location: Peru; San Ignacio Province, Cajamarca
- Coordinates: 5°09′25″S 79°16′23″W
- Area: 32,124.87 ha (79,382.3 acres)
- Established: May 20, 1988
- Governing body: SERNANP
- Website: Santuario Nacional Tabaconas Namballe

Tabaconas-Namballe National Sanctuary (Santuario Nacional Tabaconas-Namballe) is a national sanctuary in Peru established in 1988, and protects the southernmost part of the páramo ecosystem. It is located in San Ignacio Province, Cajamarca and spans an area of 32,124.87 ha (79,382.3 acres).

== History ==
In the 1940s, national and foreign investors began studies for the use of forests in the provinces of Jaén and San Ignacio. This prompted the Peruvian government to reserve an area that would serve as a nature sanctuary, by creating the Oso Perdido National Forest.

In 1977, a lumber company, El Chaupe, was granted two exploitation contracts by the government in the forests located in the districts of Chirinos, Tabaconas and Namballe, all in the province of San Ignacio. One of the contracts was terminated by the Ministry of Agriculture, declaring an extension of 49 260 hectares as an area for research purposes.

In 1982, the Department of Forest Management of La Molina National University (UNALM) proposed the establishment of the Namballe National Sanctuary. However, it was only in 1987 that some government institutions along with La Molina University carried out the studies for the establishment of a spectacled bear sanctuary in the area.

Tabaconas Namballe National Sanctuary was established on May 20, 1988, by Supreme Decree No. 051-88AG with an area of 29,500 ha.

== Geography ==
Tabaconas Namballe National Sanctuary is located in the Cordillera de Tabaconas, which is part of the Eastern Andes. The area is mountainous, with rocky outcrops and steep slopes, but with some plain or undulate terrain on the highest parts.

There are three important rivers in the area: Tabaconas, Miraflores and Blanco; the latter having almost all of is extension protected inside the sanctuary. These are part of the Marañón River basin, which in turn is a tributary of the Amazon River. During the rainy season, the flow of these rivers increase by 60%, carrying not only sediment and debris but also boulders.

In the headwaters of the Tabaconas River, in the páramo ecosystem, there is a group of lakes called Las Arrebiatadas. It consists of 4 main lakes and 12 smaller ones, which were declared a Ramsar site in 2007.

== Climate ==
In the highest parts of the sanctuary (páramo) the mean annual temperature ranges between 6 °C and 12 °C; while in the lowest (montane forest), it ranges between 22.5 °C and 24 °C. Precipitation in the páramo can be as low as 740 mm (March) and as high as 3422 mm (December); while in the montane forest precipitation fluctuates between 1150 – 1400 mm. Fog, rain and hail are frequent in the páramo.

== Ecology ==
=== Flora ===
There are two types of vegetation in the sanctuary: páramo and montane forest. Species found in páramo include: Chusquea aristata, Hypericum laricifolium, Loricaria cf. ferruginea, Festuca sp., Valeriana sp., Senecio sp., Pernettya prostrata, Gynoxys sp., Berberis sp., among others. Montane forests in the sanctuary include species from genera: Podocarpus, Miconia, Weinmannia, Clusia, Cyathea, Dicksonia, Wettinia, Alchornea, Hedyosmum, Ficus, Chusquea, Inga, Guarea, etc.; as well as trees from the family Lauraceae.

=== Fauna ===
Mammals reported in the sanctuary include: the montane guinea pig, the mountain tapir, the spectacled bear, the puma, the white-tailed deer, the grey-bellied shrew opossum, Taczanowski's Oldfield mouse, the hairy yellow-shouldered bat, Thomas's broad-nosed bat, the Venezuelan red howler, the lowland paca, the nine-banded armadillo, etc.

A total of 186 species of birds have been found in the sanctuary, among them are: the neblina metaltail, the mouse-colored thistletail, the bearded guan, the wattled guan, the Andean cock-of-the-rock, the red-billed parrot, the Peruvian racket-tail, the peregrine falcon, the crested quetzal, the chestnut-naped antpitta and the powerful woodpecker.

13 species of amphibians are present in the sanctuary, including: Lynchius parkeri, Pristimantis galdi and Osteocephalus sp.

== Activities ==
It is possible to visit Las Arrebiatadas Lakes, which are a Ramsar site and see the paramo ecosystem. There are also archaeological sites inside the park such as the Manchara petroglyphs and the village of Coyona.

== Environmental issues ==
Mining, opening of new roads, wood extraction, hunting and forest clearance for pastures and crops (all of these, illegal activities inside a protected area) are polluting the area and causing pressure on local biodiversity. These illegal activities continue due to a lack of support from local authorities to the sanctuary authorities.
