= Governorate of Bracamoros =

Governorate of the Spanish Empire

Governorate of Bracamoros Gobierno de Bracamoros
- Governorate of the Spanish Empire
- 1540s–1821
- Flag
- Capital: Jaén de Bracamoros
- Government
- Governor
  - c. 1556–1569: Juan de Salinas (first)
- Historical era: Spanish colonization of the Americas
  - Established: 15 July
  - Disestablished: 4 June 1821
Preceded by	Succeeded by
Bracamoros people; Yahuarzongos Governorate	Protectorate of Peru

The Governorate of Bracamoros (Spanish: Gobierno de Bracamoros / Tenencia de Bracamoros) was a governorate (gobernación) of the Spanish Empire established during the 16th century in an area of the Amazon rainforest originally populated by the now extinct Bracamoros people.

The area was originally established as two governorates, including the Governorate of Yahuarzongos (Spanish: Gobernación de Yahuarzongos), although it was eventually merged into a single entity. The governorate was occupied by the Liberating Expedition of Peru during the Peruvian War of Independence, later being one of the areas subject to a long-lasting territorial dispute between Ecuador and Peru.

== History ==
The Spanish arrived to the region in the 16th century, with the first expedition taking place in 1536 under the orders of Francisco Pizarro. It ended with the establishment of the short-lived town of Jérez de la Frontera, near the Pongo de Rentema, later refounded with the name of "Nueva Jérez de la Frontera," five leagues off "old Jaén" (Jaén viejo) and today non-existent. While Juan Porcel of the Spanish Army was in charge of the construction of the city's cabildo and church, he was summoned by Viceroy Blasco Núñez Vela to fight against Gonzalo Pizarro's rebellion, later joining him and continuing his expeditions under his brief government. In 1546, he again switched sides against Pizarro. Jerez was renamed to Jaén in April 1549.

Jaén was followed by the creation of the settlements of Ávila (later part of the Governorate of Quijos and destroyed during an Indian rebellion on November 29, 1578.) Perico and Chirinos. Advancements into the area had already been made from the north and south by the time Jaén was established. Near the Zamora's basin in the northern part of the area, the short-lived town of Bilbao was founded in 1541, later repopulated by Pedro de Vergara. Another town known as Zamora de los Alcaides was also established during this time. Once the area had been occupied with settlements, the governorates of Bracamoros and Yahuarzongos were established, eventually merged into the former.

From 1549 onwards, the territories were reorganised as encomiendas and distributed among the Spaniards that took control of the area, with the natives numbered at 20,000 people. By 1606, the number had been reduced to 1,500 due to the effects of forced labour and diseases brought by the Spanish. The last two huambucos died in the town Santa Rosa around 1961.

The Bourbon Reforms made the governorate, as well as Luya and Zaña, important commercial centres for the cultivation of tobacco that formed a route alongside Lima, Santiago de Chile, and other cities to the south.

The governorate, originally part of the Viceroyalty of Peru and dependent on Lima, became part of the Real Audiencia of Quito in 1563 and of the Bishopric of Trujillo since 1616. It was annexed to the Viceroyalty of New Granada in 1717 but reincorporated to Peru in 1723, joining New Granada again in 1739. Jaén supported the independence of Trujillo and declared its independence from Spain and the Real Audiencia of Quito on June 4, 1821, joining the Protectorate of Peru and being represented at its first congress in 1822. The Province of Jaén was created on May 19, 1828, as part of the department of Trujillo and then of La Libertad until the creation of the Department of Cajamarca in 1855.

== List of representatives ==
The following is an incomplete list of governors of Bracamoros:

- Juan de Salinas y Loyola, adelantado (c. 1556–?)
- José María Palacios, Mayor (1821–?)

== See also ==
- Ecuadorian–Peruvian territorial dispute
