= Bracamoros =

Region in Ecuador and Peru

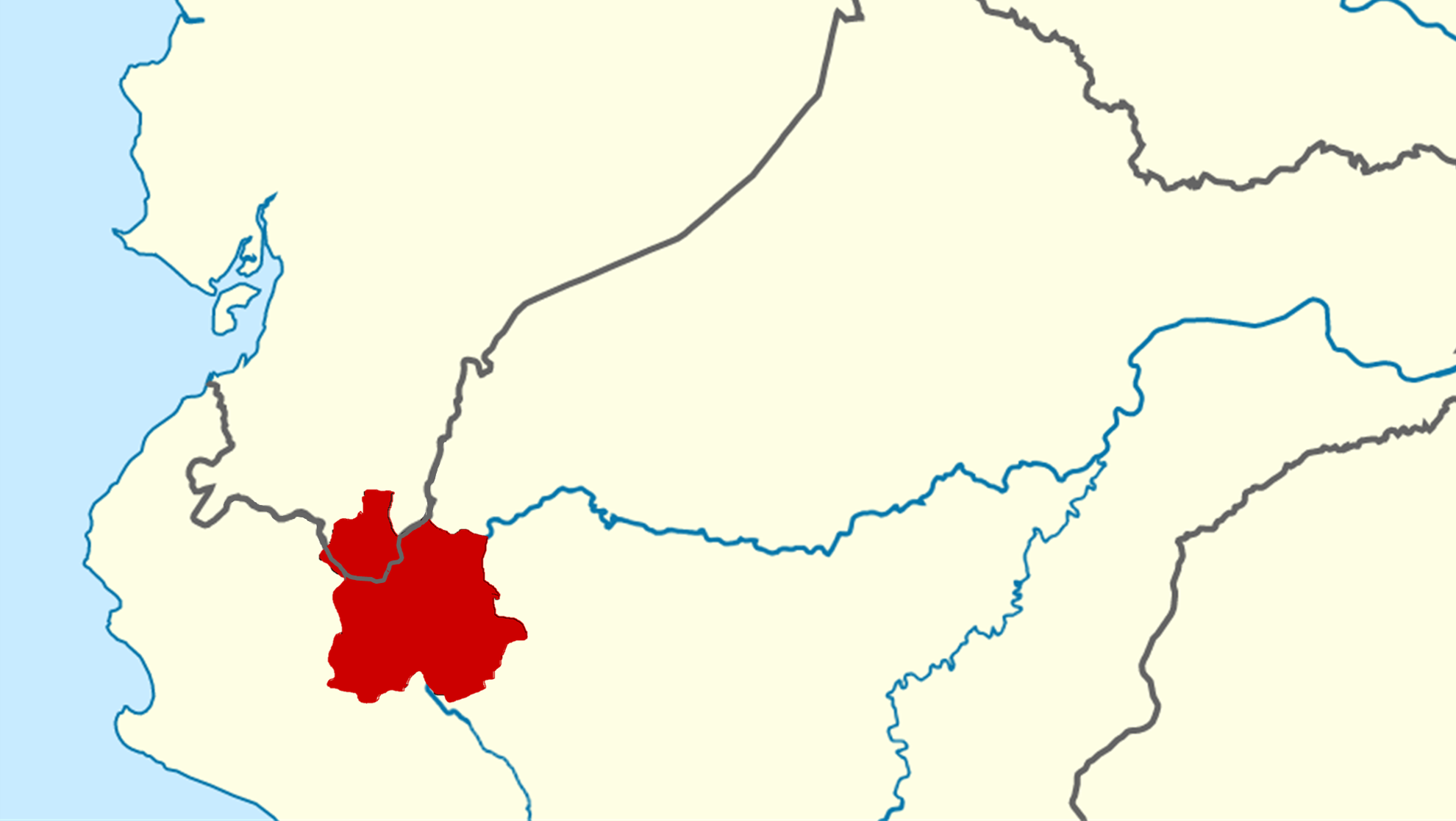
Map of the Chinchipe/Marañón region with modern borders.

Bracamoros (Quechua: pukamuru, Aguaruna: pakamuru, "painted face"; also written Pacamuros) is a region of numerous extinct tribal groups (which include a tribe of the same name) from the Ecuadorian and Peruvian Amazon rainforest, located in the watershed of the Zamora River (although it has also been identified as the region of the Chinchipe and Marañón Rivers).

The area is now part of the former Ecuadorian province of Santiago Zamora Province (today Zamora-Chinchipe Province) and the Peruvian provinces of San Ignacio and Jaén, within the departments of Cajamarca and Amazonas.

== History ==
The tribes that once lived in the area were the Nehipe (also known as the Chuquimayo or Chinchipe), Chirinos, Perico, Pacaraes, Mandinga, Tabancaras, Joroca, Jolluca, Llanqueconi, Tomependa, Chamaya, Bagua, Copallín, Canas de Cacahuari (also known as Lomas del Viento), Comechingón, Huambucos (or Huambos), Maracacona, Moqui, Girapaconi, Tamborapa, and four more at the headwaters of the Chinchipe and by the Marañón's shores. Each group received the name of "province" by the Spanish. The Tabaconas and Huambos have been documented as once belonging to the Inca Empire, as Pedro Cieza de León wrote that an Inca army once unsuccessfully attempted to occupy the area in 1520. A common factor among the tribes was the practice of agriculture, with their diet consisting of corn, yuca, sweet potatoes and porotos.

The Spanish arrived to the region in the 16th century, with the first expedition taking place in 1536 under the orders of Francisco Pizarro. It ended with the establishment of the short-lived town of Jérez de la Frontera, near the Pongo de Rentema. It was later refounded with the name of Nueva Jérez de la Frontera, (Note: The town is described as the first foundation of Jaén, although it was later reestablished five leagues off "old Jaén" (Jaén viejo), today non-existent. While Juan Porcel was in charge of the construction of the city's cabildo and church, he was summoned by Viceroy Blasco Núñez Vela to fight against Gonzalo Pizarro's rebellion, later joining him and continuing his expeditions under his brief government. In 1546, he again switched sides against Pizarro. Jerez was renamed to Jaén in April 1549.) followed by the creation of the settlements of Ávila, (Note: The town was later part of the Governorate of Quijos and would be later destroyed during a rebellion of the indians of the same name on November 29, 1578.) Perico and Chirinos. Advancements into the area had already been made from the north and south by the time Jaén was established. Near the Zamora's basin in the northern part of the area, the short-lived town of Bilbao was founded in 1541. (Note: The town was later repopulated by Pedro de Vergara.) Another town known as Zamora de los Alcaides was also established during this time. Once the area had been occupied with settlements, the governorates of Bracamoros and Yahuarzongos (Note: Spanish: Gobernación de Yahuarzongos) were established, eventually merged into the former.

From 1549 onwards, the territories were reorganised as encomiendas and distributed among the Spaniards that took control of the area, with the natives numbered at 20,000 people. By 1606, the number had been reduced to 1,500 due to the effects of forced labour and diseases brought by the Spanish. The last two Huambucos died in the town of Santa Rosa around 1961.

In 2009, the remains of a battle between the Incas and Bracamoros were discovered at Palanda Canton in Ecuador.

== See also ==
- Ecuadorian–Peruvian territorial dispute
