= Radio Marañón =

Coordinates: 5°42′34.07″S 78°48′42.05″W

Jaén; Peru
- Broadcast area: Northern Peru: provinces of Jaén, Bagua, San Ignacio

Programming
- Language: Spanish

Ownership
- Owner: Society of Jesus

Links
- Website: Radio Marañón

Radio Marañón was founded by the Society of Jesus in 1976 to further the integral development of the people in northern Peru. It is headquartered in the Apostolic Vicariate of Jaén, which is also administered by the Jesuits, and is named for the chief source of the Amazon River, the Marañón River, which flows through Jaén.

== History ==
After 1985, the Educational Institute of Radio Marañón (INTERAMA) was created.

In 1994, it became a member of the Latin American Association of Radio Education, and later of the World Association of Community Radio Broadcasters. During the repressive, right-leaning Fujimori 1990s, seven Radio Marañón journalists were threatened and one narrowly escaped death in an assassination attempt.

In 2001, FM Stereo Marañón 96.1 "Atrévete" was initiated as a commercial station. In 2003, the station was one of eight recipients of the Eloy Arribas award bestowed by Peru's National Radio Coordinator (CNR). In 2005, CNR decried unjust charges against Francisco Muguiro Ibarra, director of Radio Marañón de Jaén, in which Panamericana Televisión accused him and several communal leaders of supporting a violent terrorist network because they defended local communities from the intrusion of foreign mining companies. CNR also mentioned Muguiro's active participation in the Life and Peace National Campaign in the 1980s, when he received a death threat from the Shining Path communist party in Peru.

In 2011, the programming of FM and AM were unified with programs reaching both rural and urban areas.
