= Jaén, Peru =

Jaén Jaén de Bracamoros
- Town
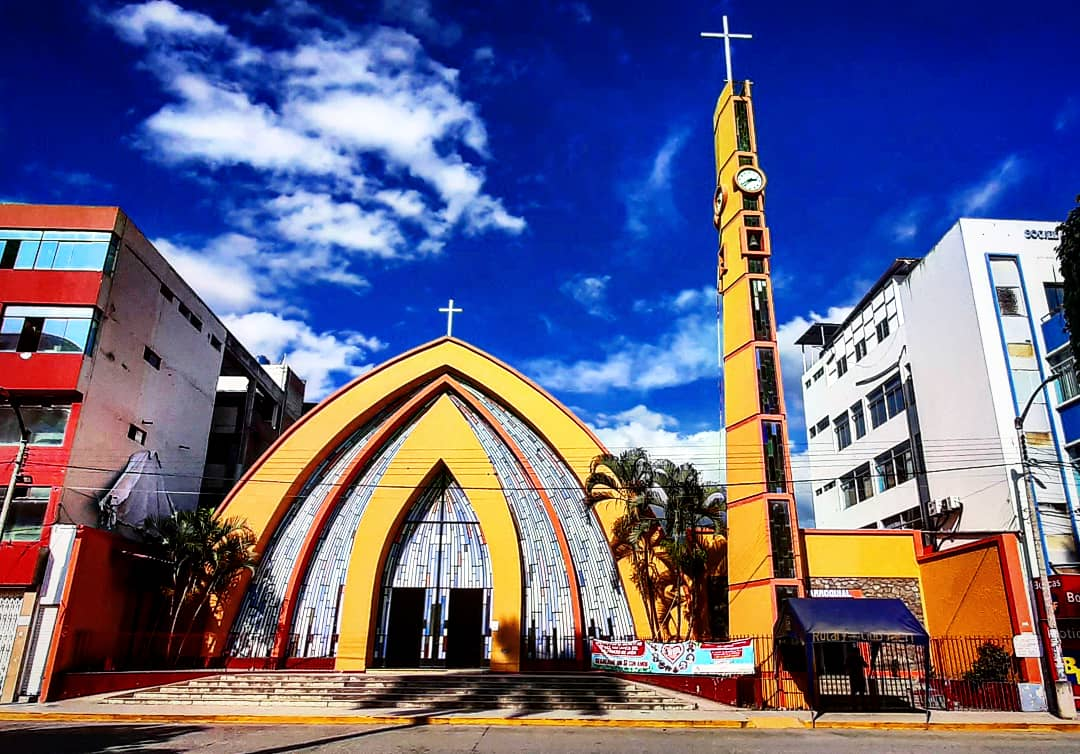
- View of Jaén

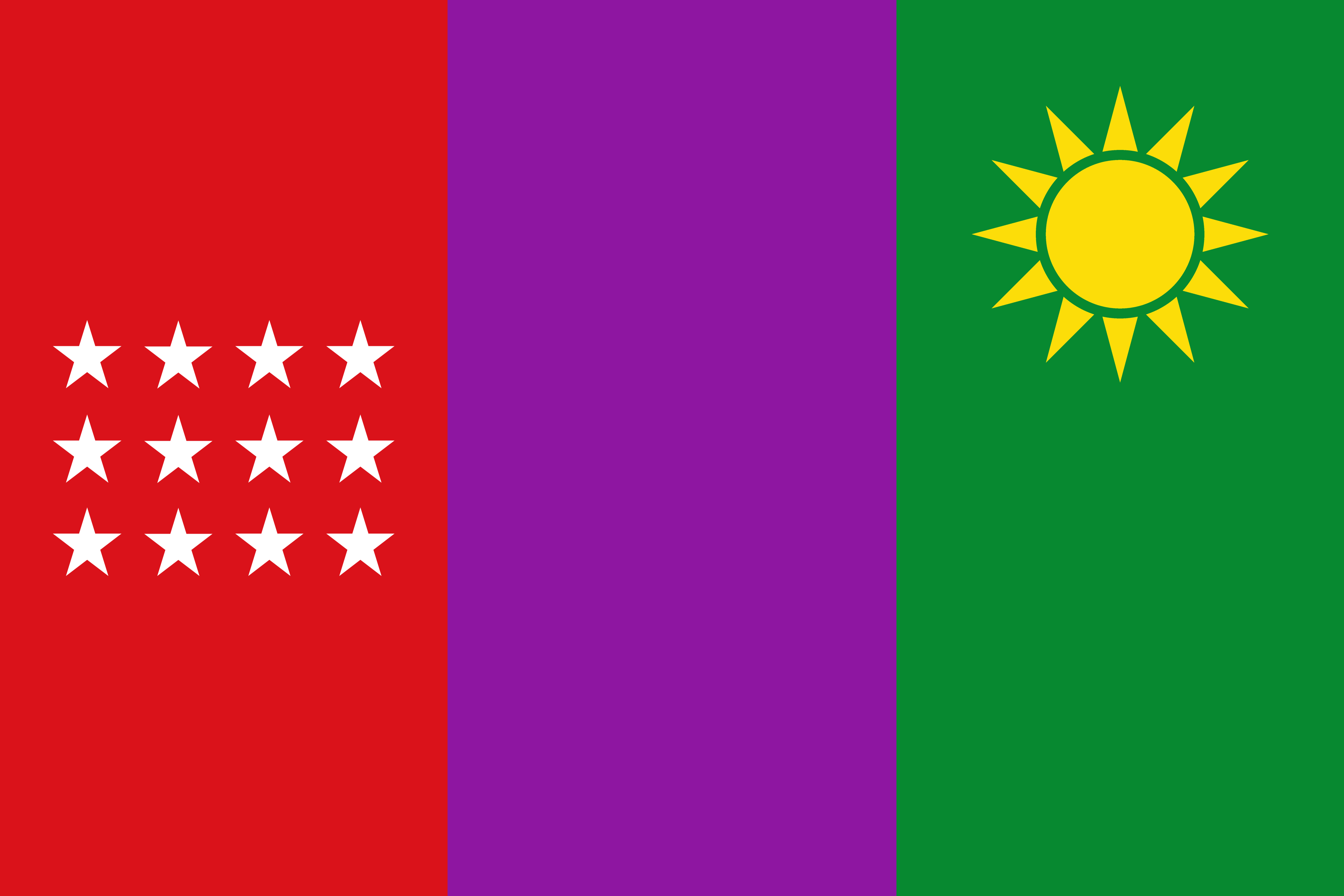
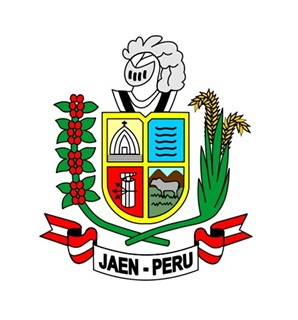
- Flag Seal
- Nickname: "Cuna de la peruanidad" (Birthplace of Peruvian-ness)
- Location within Peru
- Coordinates: 5°42′30″S 78°48′30″W
- Country: Peru
- Region: Cajamarca
- Province: Jaén
- Founded: April 1549
- Named for: Jaén, Spain

Government
  - Mayor: Francisco Delgado Rivera

Area
  - Total: 53,725 km^{2} (20,743 sq mi)
- Elevation: 729 m (2,392 ft)

Population (2017)
  - Total: 81,587
  - Estimate (2015): 93,631
  - Density: 1.5186/km^{2} (3.9332/sq mi)
- Demonym: Jaeno(a)
- Time zone: UTC-5 (PET)
  - Summer (DST): UTC-5 (PET)
- Postal code: 076
- Website: www.munijaen.gob.pe

Jaén (Spanish: [xaˈen]), founded as San Leandro de Jaén and then known as Jerez de la Frontera (later Nueva Jerez de la Frontera) and finally as Jaén de Bracamoros since April 1549, (Note: The town of "Jerez de la Frontera" is described as the first foundation of Jaén, while "Jerez de la Frontera" was later reestablished five leagues off "old Jaén" (Jaén viejo), today described as non-existent. While Conquistador Juan Porcel was in charge of the construction of the city's cabildo and church, he was summoned by Viceroy Blasco Núñez Vela to fight against Gonzalo Pizarro's rebellion, later joining him and continuing his expeditions under his brief government. In 1546, he again switched sides against Pizarro. Jerez was renamed to "Jaén de Bracamoros" in April 1549, after the region of the same name.) is a city which is the capital of the Jaén Province in the Cajamarca Region in Peru, located in the high jungle of northern Peru. It is the seat of the Catholic Apostolic Vicariate of St. Francis Xavier, also known as Apostolic Vicariate of Jaén en Peru.

== Geography ==
=== Climate ===
Jaen has a warm climate all year round. It is one of the warmest cities in Peru, but does have frequent showers.

== Culture ==
Jaén is also known as Land of the Brave Bracamoros. Evidence of their culture is located at Hermogenes Mejía Solf Museum, located in the same city.

== History ==
=== Early inhabitants ===
The origin of the city dates back to the Late Horizon period, between 1,000 and 1,500 B.C, larger settlements were located in the valleys of the present provinces of Jaén, Bagua and San Ignacio.

In the valley of Jaén there lies the great archaeological site Montegrande, with the presence of mounds and pottery styles of Pre-Chavin cultures and the Turuco, immense pre-Columbian cemetery located in Bellavista, Ingatambo in Pomahuaca. Similar sites are located in the valleys of Chamaya, Shumba, Tabaconas, Chinchipe and Utcubamba.

In 2010, two ancient pyramid complexes were discovered near the town of Jaen. The largest mound, over an acre at its base, was found by Peruvian archaeologist, Quirino Olivera. He found evidence of massive stone constructions. Walls were up to three feet thick. Also he found ramps and other constructions stretching back to at least 800 BC, or maybe 2,000 BC.

The excavations were carried out under a joint program between Peru and Ecuador, that investigates the basins of the rivers of Mayo, Chinchipe, Marañón, Utcubamba and Puyango-Tumbes.

Early Ceremonial Architecture dating to 800-100 B.C. was also discovered in the Peru's high jungle, known in Spanish as ceja de selva. This was at Huayurco, Jaén Region, and it was studied by archaeologist Ryan Clasby.

According to him, Huayurco played a significant role in long-distance interregional trade between Andean and Amazonian cultures happening between 1800 and 200 BC. Huayurco is remarkable for producing some unusual and unique stone bowls on a large scale. Over 250 examples of these bowls are now presented in the local museum. By producing and trading these bowls, Huayurco found an important role for itself in the long-distance exchange networks.

More recently (2022), the Jaén stone vessel tradition, and its participation within the Andean interaction spheres has been updated to between 2500 and 800 BC.

=== Pre-Inca period ===
In these bountiful lands of north-east Peru, the Jivaro culture, whose ethnicity belonged to the Huánbucos and the Patagonians, flourished. They settled in the Chuquimayo Valley, Chinchipe.

The Incas attempted to bring the Jivaro under their influence, but were defeated. The Incas called the Jivaro 'Pakamoros' or 'Bracamoros' from the Quechua words 'paka', meaning 'red', and 'muro' meaning 'painted'. This was in reference to the Jivaro custom of painting their face and chest with the red dye of annatto seeds, for ceremonies and battle.

=== Inca Empire ===
The chronicler Pedro Cieza de León says that the Inca king Huayna Capac attempted to conquer the Bracamoros (Indians), as they called the Jivaros, but was defeated and fled. The historian Cabello de Balboa claims that Huáscar or rather his brother Huanca Auqui, envying the success of Atahualpa in Quijos, he sent Pakamuros up against two expeditions.

Jijón and Caamaño (historians) describe the Bracamoros (or Pakamuros) as Jivaro Indians of strong physical characteristics and an independent, warlike and enterprising spirit. They were a major concern to the Incas, who repeatedly tried - but failed - to subdue them. Instead, by peaceful means, they exerted a notable influence through the present-day Jaén Province and the rest of the north-eastern region.

=== Age of Discovery and Conquest of Jaén ===
The first of the Spanish Conquistadors to venture into this part of north-east Peru was Captain Pedro Vergara, who is considered the discoverer for the Spaniards of the region of the tribe of the Bracamoros (Pakamuros), and the Yahuarsongo, in an area of a hundred leagues, succeeding in subjugating the tribes through relentless and savage military campaigning.

=== Colonial Era ===
By the year 1607, the location of the city of Jaén de Bracamoros had changed four times, before finally settling just north of the Marañón-Huancabamba junction in the small valley of Tomependa.

This Jaén de Bracamoros grew into an important center of outreach and missionary work, and was appointed the capital of the district by the Council of the Indies.

The most important industry at the time were metal workshops, where tools such as machetes and axes, which were vital in a region where you had to continually cut down trees and branches, were forged.

=== Jaén during Independence ===
On June 4, 1821, a public meeting was held in Jaen's main square, which included delegates from the city and surrounding districts, including Chirinos, San Ignacio, Colasay and Tomependa. At the meeting, those attending declared the independence of Jaén de Bracamoros from the Royal Audience of Quito and Spain. This was then ratified by the Governor, D. Juan Antonio Checa. This act earned Jaen the title of Cuna de Peruanidad ('Birthplace of Peruvian-ness').

Initially, Jaen belonged to Trujillo Region, then La Libertad, and finally Cajamarca, after its creation in 1855.

== Landmarks ==
Jaen has a great deal of potential as a tourism destination, owing to the large number of natural and archaeological attractions accessible from the city. However, it has not traditionally been a popular visitor destination, mainly on account of its distance from large population centres, being a five-hour drive from Chiclayo, the erstwhile nearest airport, and 18 hours by bus from Lima.

Those people that have stayed overnight have overwhelmingly been nationals, with only 2% being overseas visitors.

Since September 2016, though, there have been daily direct flights between Jaen and Lima, operated by LAN Peru, so it is expected that visitor numbers will increase markedly, as Jaen's Shumba Airport is now the closest access point to the region of Amazonas, with its marquee attractions of Kuelap Fortress, Karajia and Gocta Falls.

Jaen itself has a number of attractions in and around the city:

- The Plaza de Armas, is modern, but pleasant, with greenery and a fountain.
- The Cathedral, overlooking the Plaza de Armas, is also modern in design. It contains a statue of the Lord of Huamantanga, the patron saint of the city, among other works of art.
- Hermogenes Mejia Solf Regional Museum offers a collection of the region's archaeology and ethnology, located a short distance outside Jaen city.
- The Botanical Garden with more than 600 varieties of regional plants, on the outskirts of the city.
- Gotas de Agua is a private Equatorial Dry Forest reserve, 7 km (4 miles) from the city, offering excellent birding.
- Almendral Hot Springs, whose water is rich in health-giving sulphur and iron, is 25 km (16 miles) from the city.
- Huamantanga Forest, three hours to the west, is the source of the Amoju River and a small ecological paradise, hosting a wide diversity of orchids, birds such as the Cock-of-the-Rock, and mammals such as the Spectacled Bear, among many others.
- Cutervo National Park, the oldest protected area in Peru, is located 50 km (31 miles) to the south of Jaen. At between 2,200 meters (7,218 ft) and 3,500 meters (11,483 ft) above sea level, the micro-climate ensures almost constant moisture, and a flora rich in epiphytes. It is also one of the few locations where the endangered Oilbird - the only nocturnal, flying, fruit-eating bird in the world - can be found.
- A number of scenic waterfalls, typical of High Jungle landscapes - including La Bella Encantadora, La Momia, San Andres, Velo de la Novia, La Yunga, Calabozo, and Chorro Blanco - are within reach of Jaen.

== Demography ==
According to the INEI its growth rate for 81–93 years was 2.3 and its estimated 1999 population was 85,021 inhabitants, with a population density of 139.6 hab/km^{2}. Two important features of its population, which is only 30.8% rural and 42.6% under 15 years.

By the end of 2012 a population of 170,000 inhabitants was estimated, without including the sector of Fila Alta.

== See also ==
- 2005 northern Peru earthquake
- Cajamarca Region
