= Ygnacio =

Ygnacio may refer to:

Given name:

- Ygnacio Coronel (1795–1862), settler in the Pueblo de Los Ángeles of Mexican Alta California
- Luis Ygnacio Liendo (born 1980), amateur Venezuelan Greco-Roman wrestler in the men's lightweight category
- Ygnacio Martínez (1774–1848), important figure in the development of Contra Costa County, California
- Ygnacio Sepulveda (1842–1916), one of the first two judges of the Superior Court in Los Angeles County, California
- Ygnacio del Valle (1808–1880), rancher and landowner in the eastern Santa Clara River Valley, California, United States
- Ygnacio Vallejo (1807–1890), Californio military commander, politician, and rancher

Places:

- San Ygnacio (disambiguation)
- San Ygnacio Creek, small stream of water located in Webb County, Texas
- Ygnacio Palomares Adobe, a one-story adobe in Pomona, California, built between 1850 and 1855 as a residence for Don Ygnacio Palomares
