= San Ignacio =

San Ignacio (the Spanish language name of St. Ignatius) is a common toponym in parts of the world where that language is or was spoken:

== Argentina ==
- San Ignacio, Argentina, Misiones Province
- San Ignacio Miní, a Jesuit mission in Misiones Province

== Belize ==
- San Ignacio, Belize (Cayo District), towns in western Belize

== Bolivia ==
- San Ignacio de Moxos
- San Ignacio de Velasco
- San Ignacio, Mamoré
- San Ignacio de Zamucos

== Chile ==
- San Ignacio, Chile, a town in the Ñuble Region

== Costa Rica ==
- San Ignacio District, Acosta, San José Province

== El Salvador ==
- San Ignacio, Chalatenango

== Honduras ==
- San Ignacio, Francisco Morazán

== Mexico ==
- San Ignacio, Baja California Sur
- San Ignacio, Chihuahua (Práxedis G. Guerrero)
- San Ignacio, Sinaloa
- San Ignacio Río Muerto (Sonora)
- San Ignacio Lagoon
- San Ignacio Cerro Gordo, Jalisco

== Northern Mariana Islands ==
- Former colonial name of Pagan

== Paraguay ==
- San Ignacio, Paraguay, a city and district in the Misiones Department

== Peru ==
- San Ignacio, Perú
- San Ignacio District, Peru
- San Ignacio Province, Cajamarca Region

== Spain ==
- San Ignacio (Ponga)

== United States ==
- San Ignacio, Texas

== See also ==
- St. Ignatius Church (disambiguation)
