= Juan de Salinas y Loyola =

Spanish conquistador

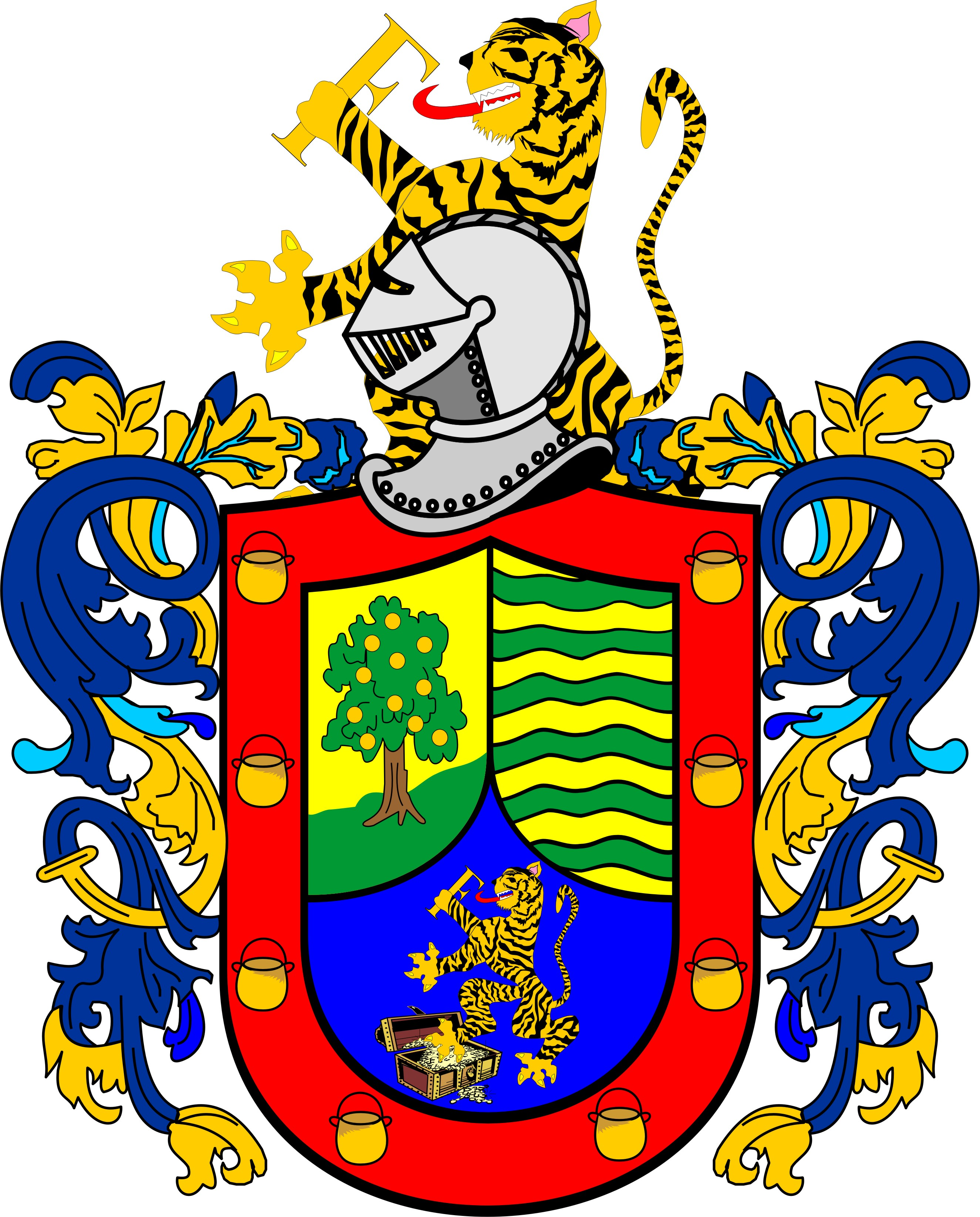
Coat of Arms of Juan de Salinas y Loyola, granted on 20 November 1537.

Juan de Salinas y Loyola (1492–19 January 1582) was a Spanish discoverer, conqueror and hidalgo belonging to the Alava branch of the House of Hoñaz y Loyola of Azpeitia. He was the governor of Yaguarzongo and Bracamoros and the adelantado of these provinces between 1571 and 1578.

== Biography ==
He was the legitimate son of Bernardo Vélez de Loyola and Guiomar Fernández de Salinas, neighbors in the town of Salinas de Añana. He travelled to the Americas and participated with Hernán Cortés in the conquest of Mexico.

In 1531 he joined the company of Francisco Pizarro in the Spanish conquest of the Inca Empire, accompanying him to the Santa Elena Peninsula and Puná Island. He was present at the march to Cajamarca and during the capture and death of Atahualpa; once the ransom was paid, de Salinas set out with Hernando Pizarro, taking to king the " king's fifth" of that treasure, which belonged to King Charles I of Spain.

He participated in the conquest of the Ecuadorian east and Peruvian Northeast. He founded many cities in the Amazon basin, including Valladolid (Ecuador), Loyola, Santiago de las Montañas, Logroño de los Caballeros, Santa María de Leiva, San Francisco de Borja (Ecuador), Jaén de Bracamoros, Sevilla de Oro and Santa María de Nieva.

On 8 December 1548, de Salinas participated in the final foundation of Loja, together with Alonso de Mercadillo. Then on October 6, 1549, he attended the foundation of Zamora. He colonized the areas that would be the Yaguarzongo and Maynas governorates, he was also the first governor of Yaguarzongo and Bracamoros by 1556. He was later named "adelantado" of these areas in order to advance the area's colonization and exploration.

On 12 April 1557, he was present together with Gil Ramírez Dávalos at the foundation of Cuenca, on the ruins of the Inca city of Tomebamba, in honor of the Spanish city of the same name. Later he toured the Western Amazon regions where he made important discoveries, including the Morona and Pastaza rivers. On 1558, in search of "El Dorado", discovered the Pongo de Manseriche in the Marañón(Peru) river basin. He passed to Maynas, to the Ucayali River, was first to arrive east of Cuzco, and finally returned to Loja in 1559.

In 1557, he married Bernardina de Alderete Mercado in Lima; they had Gaspar de Salinas y Loyola as their only child, named in honor of his comrade in arms, Gaspar de Valladolid y Angulo.

At the end of 1581, he made his will where he donated all his livestock to build a hospital in the town of Cañaribamba, currently Girón.
