= Inka Tampu =

Inka Tampu or Inkatampu (Quechua for "Inca inn", hispanicized spellings Incatambo, Inkatambo, Inca Tambo, Ingatambo) may refer to:

- Inka Tampu, Cajamarca, an archaeological site in the Cajamarca Region, Peru
- Inka Tampu, Huayopata, an archaeological site in the Huayopata District, La Convención Province, Cusco Region, Peru
- Inka Tampu, Vilcabamba, an archaeological site in the Vilcabamba District, La Convención Province, Cusco Region, Peru
