= San Ygnacio =

San Ygnacio may refer to:

- San Ygnacio, Texas, place in Zapata County, Texas, United States
- San Ygnacio Creek, stream in Texas, United States
- Rio San Ygnacio, alternative name for Russian River (California), United States

== See also ==
- San Ignacio (disambiguation)
