= Cristóbal Llatas =

Politician from Peru (born 1962)

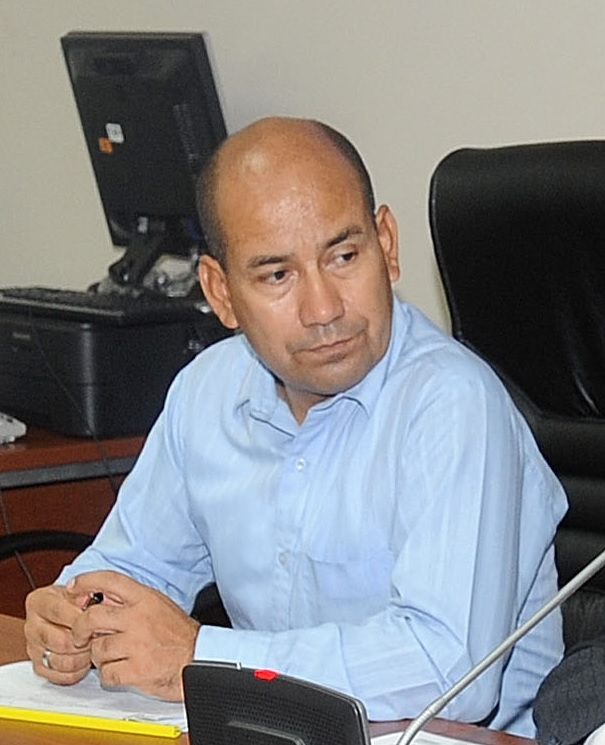
Cristóbal Luis Llatas Altamirano

Cristóbal Luis Llatas Altamirano (born June 23, 1962) is a Peruvian politician. He was elected to Congress for the period 2011-2016 for the Cajamarca region.

In 1986, he graduated as a lawyer from the Pedro Ruiz Gallo National University in Lambayeque. He has practiced his profession liberally, also working as external legal advisor for the district municipalities of Santo Domingo de la Capilla and La Coipa. Between 1991 and 2008 he was a teacher in the Local Educational Management Unit of Jaén.

In the regional elections of, 2006, he was a candidate for regional vice president of Cajamarca for the Peruvian Nationalist Party, accompanying the candidacy for regional president of Javier Bobadilla, which was not victorious. In the 2011 general elections, he ran as a candidate for Congress for the Cajamarca constituency for the Peru Wins. He obtained 17,731 preferential votes, resulting in a congressional election for the period 2011-2016.

In 2015, he was one of the congressman who approved rule against 'swallow votes'.
