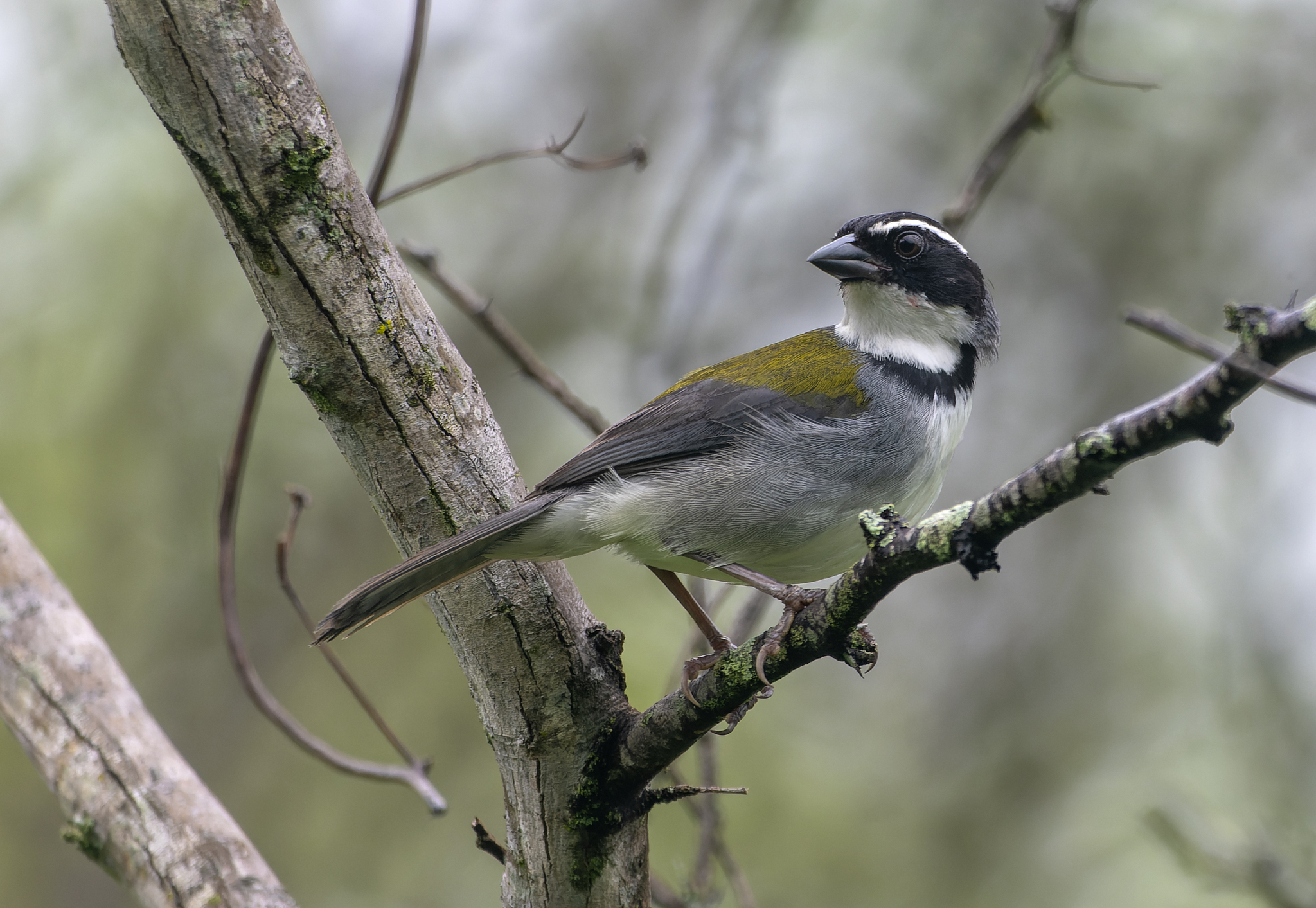

Conservation status
- Near Threatened (IUCN 3.1)

Scientific classification
- Kingdom: Animalia
- Phylum: Chordata
- Class: Aves
- Order: Passeriformes
- Family: Passerellidae
- Genus: Arremon
- Species: A. nigriceps

Binomial name
- Arremon nigriceps Taczanowski, 1880

= Marañón sparrow =

Maranon sparrow

Species of bird

The Maranon sparrow (Note: The IOC and most other taxonomic systems spell the English name with no diacritics. The IOC is the Wikipedia standard for bird names.) (Arremon nigriceps) is a Near Threatened species of passerine bird in the New World sparrow family Passerellidae. It is found in Ecuador and Peru.

== Taxonomy and systematics ==
The Maranon sparrow was formally described in 1880 by the Polish zoologist Władysław Taczanowski based on a single specimen that had been collected by the Polish zoologist Jan Sztolcman at Callacatein in the Department of Cajamarca of northern Peru. Taczanowski coined the binomial Arremon nigriceps where the specific epithet combines the Latin niger meaning "black" with -ceps meaning "-headed".

The maranon sparrow was formerly considered to be a subspecies of the black-capped sparrow (Arremon abeillei). Based on plumage and vocalization differences and significant genetic divergence, taxonomic systems began separating them in 2016. The IOC, AviList, the Clements taxonomy, and BirdLife International's Handbook of the Birds of the World have adopted the split. However, as of early 2026 the independent South American Classification Committee has not done so. A 2022 study confirmed that the two are sister species.

== Description ==
The Maranon sparrow is about 15 cm (5.9 in) long. The sexes have the same plumage. Adults have a mostly black head with a white throat and a wide white stripe from above the eye down the side of the nape. Their upperparts and tail are olive green. Their lesser wing coverts are olive green and the rest gray; some individuals have small pale tips on them that form two wing bars. Their flight feathers are dusky with blue-gray edges. Their throat is white with a black band below it across the upper breast. Their flanks are gray and the rest of their underparts white. They have a brown iris, a black bill, and black legs and feet.

== Distribution and habitat ==
The Maranon sparrow is found in the upper watershed of the Marañón River. Its range begins on the tributary Chinchipe River in extreme southern Ecuador's Zamora-Chinchipe Province and extends south in Peru to near the Marañón's headwaters in southern Amazonas Department. It primarily inhabits somewhat dry tropical deciduous forest and gallery forest; locally it occurs in more humid evergreen forest. In elevation it reaches 1,800 m (5,900 ft).

== Behavior ==
=== Movement ===
The Maranon sparrow is a year-round resident.

=== Feeding ===
The Maranon sparrow's diet has not been studied; it is assumed to include insects, seeds, and fruits. It usually is seen singly or in pairs. It forages on the ground or near it in low vegetation. It usually does not join mixed-species feeding flocks.

=== Breeding ===
Nothing is known about the Maranon sparrow's breeding biology.

=== Vocalization ===
The Maranon sparrow's song is "a variable high series of thin, buzzy whistles and loose trills, for example: tsew tsew tsi-tetetetete". The song is subtly different from that of its sister black-capped sparrow. Its calls are a "very short, high-pitched tsik", a "high-pitched sibilant or lisping descending tseew", and a "high-pitched buzzy bzee". The first two are usually repeated a few times. The species usually sings from a fairly low perch and usually at dawn and the early morning.

== Status ==
The IUCN originally in 2016 assessed the Maranon sparrow as being of Least Concern but since 2024 as Near Threatened. Its population size is not known and is believed to be decreasing. "Due to the species' preference for forests, it is vulnerable to the loss and degradation of habitat, mainly through logging and expansion of agriculture and livestock pastures. Logging events appear currently small-scale, but are widespread across the entire known range." It is considered fairly common in Peru.
