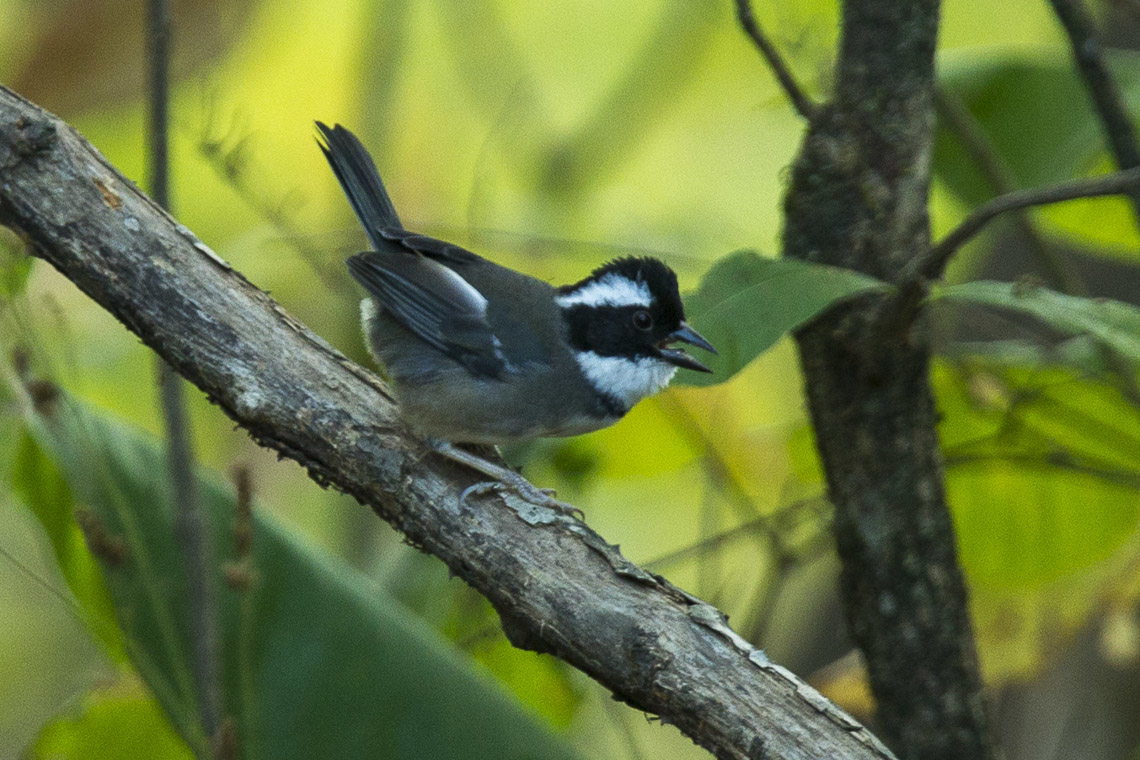

Conservation status
- Least Concern (IUCN 3.1)

Scientific classification
- Kingdom: Animalia
- Phylum: Chordata
- Class: Aves
- Order: Passeriformes
- Family: Passerellidae
- Genus: Arremon
- Species: A. abeillei

Binomial name
- Arremon abeillei Lesson, 1844

Audio
- Song

= Black-capped sparrow =

Species of bird

The black-capped sparrow (Arremon abeillei) is a species of bird in the family Passerellidae, the New World sparrows. It is found in Ecuador and Peru.

== Taxonomy and systematics ==
The black-capped sparrow was formally described in 1844 with its current binomial Arremon abeillei.

The black-capped sparrow is monotypic. However, what is now the Maranon sparrow (A. nigriceps) was previously treated as a subspecies; taxonomic systems began separating them in 2016. A later study confirmed that the two are sister species.

== Description ==
The black-capped sparrow is about 15 cm (5.9 in) long and weighs about 26 g (0.92 oz). The sexes have the same plumage. Adults have a mostly black head with a white throat and a wide white stripe from above the eye down the side of the nape. They often raise their crown feathers in a shaggy crest. Their upperparts and tail are blue-gray. Their wing coverts are blue-gray; some individuals have small pale tips on them that form two wing bars. Their flight feathers are dusky with blue-gray edges. Their throat is white with a black band below it across the upper breast. Their flanks are gray and the rest of their underparts white. They have a brown iris, a black bill, and black legs and feet.

== Distribution and habitat ==
The black-capped sparrow is found along the Pacific coast from central Manabí Province in Ecuador south into Peru as far as northern Cajamarca Department. However, there is a gap in Ecuador's southern Guayas Province. It primarily inhabits somewhat dry tropical deciduous forest, gallery forest, and scrublands; locally it occurs in more humid evergreen forest especially in Ecuador. In Ecuador it ranges in elevation mostly from sea level to 800 m (2,600 ft) but locally reaches 1,600 m (5,200 ft). In Peru it reaches 1,800 m (5,900 ft).

== Behavior ==
=== Movement ===
The black-capped sparrow is a year-round resident.

=== Feeding ===
The black-capped sparrow's diet has not been studied; it is assumed to include insects, seeds, and fruits. It usually is seen singly or in pairs. It forages on the ground or near it in low vegetation.

=== Breeding ===
Nothing is known about the black-capped sparrow's breeding biology.

=== Vocalization ===
The black-capped sparrow's song is described as "a fast tseeét, tsi-tsi-tsi-tsi tseeét and as "a variable high series of thin, buzzy whistles and loose trills, for example: tsew tsew tsi-tetetetete". Its calls are a "very short, high-pitched tsik", a "high-pitched sibilant or lisping descending tseew", and a "high-pitched buzzy bzee". The first two are usually repeated a few times. The species usually sings from a fairly low perch and usually at dawn and the early morning.

== Conservation status ==
The IUCN has assessed the black-capped sparrow as being of Least Concern. Its population size is not known but is believed to be stable. "Due to the species' preference for forests, it is vulnerable to the loss and degradation of habitat, mainly through logging and expansion of agriculture and livestock pastures." It is considered fairly common in both countries in its range.
