= Lake Casa Blanca International State Park =

State park in Texas, United States

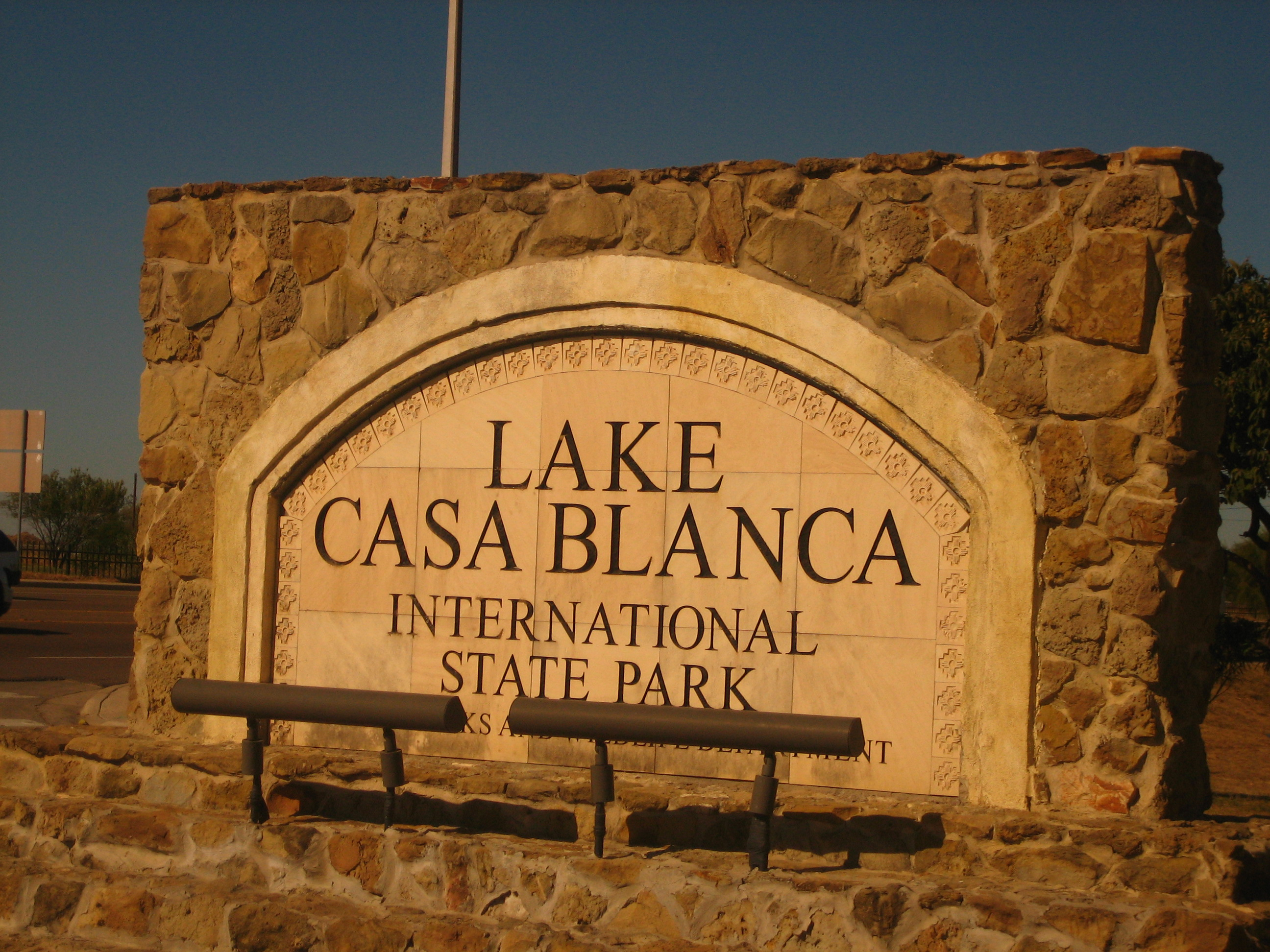

- Location within Texas Location within the United States
- Location: Webb County, Texas
- Nearest city: Laredo
- Coordinates: 27°32′22″N 99°27′5″W
- Area: 525 acres (212 ha)
- Established: 1991
- Visitors: 185,094 (in 2025)
- Governing body: Texas Parks and Wildlife Department
- Website: Official site

Lake Casa Blanca International State Park is a 525-acre state park located in Laredo, Texas, United States a few miles east of the border with Mexico. The park was originally managed by Webb County and the City of Laredo. It opened as a state park in 1991 and is managed by the Texas Parks and Wildlife Department.

== Nature ==
During the Eocene Epoch, about 38 to 54 million years ago, the area was a tropical, mangrove palm swamp. Paleontologists have unearthed fossils of primates, fish and reptiles in the park.

=== Animals ===
Mammal species likely to be seen in the park are black-tailed jackrabbit and eastern cottontail and white-tailed deer. The threatened Texas horned lizard has been sighted in the park. Common birds in the park are vermilion flycatcher, golden-fronted and ladder-backed woodpeckers, cactus wren, mourning and white-winged dove, Couch's kingbird and greater roadrunner.

=== Plants ===
The park is in the Tamaulipan mezquital ecoregion. Plants typical of this country include honey mesquite, palo verde and prickly pear cactus. Guajillo and huisache is abundant, and other species such as horse crippler and fishhook cactus can be found as well.

== Activities ==
Lake Casa Blanca is accessible from the park and water activities including swimming, boating, jet-skiing, and water-skiing are popular. Anglers catch largemouth bass, sunfish, white crappie, black crappie, bluegill, channel catfish and blue catfish in the lake.

They are few other large public recreational areas in and around Laredo, so the day-use part of the park sees heavy traffic, especially on weekends and holidays. The locals gather to picnic and use the playground, baseball field, and volleyball and basketball courts.

Other activities include hiking, cycling, birdwatching, geocaching, and camping.

== See also ==
- List of Texas state parks
