= Chontali District =

Coordinates: 5.6449°S 79.0865°W

Chontali
- District
- Interactive map of Chontali
- Country: Peru
- Region: Cajamarca
- Province: Jaén
- Founded: December 28, 1943
- Capital: Chontali

Government
  - Mayor: Lindon Bagner Estela Balcazar

Area
  - Total: 428.55 km^{2} (165.46 sq mi)
- Elevation: 1,500 m (4,900 ft)

Population (2005 census)
  - Total: 10,344
  - Density: 24.137/km^{2} (62.515/sq mi)
- Time zone: UTC-5 (PET)
- UBIGEO: 060803

Chontali District is one of twelve districts of the province Jaén in Peru.
