= San José del Alto District =

Coordinates: 5.4346°S 79.0790°W

San José del Alto
- District
- Interactive map of San José del Alto
- Country: Peru
- Region: Cajamarca
- Province: Jaén
- Founded: December 28, 1943
- Capital: San José del Alto

Government
  - Mayor: José Leonor Vallejos Troya

Area
  - Total: 634.11 km^{2} (244.83 sq mi)
- Elevation: 1,500 m (4,900 ft)

Population (2005 census)
  - Total: 6,608
  - Density: 10.42/km^{2} (26.99/sq mi)
- Time zone: UTC-5 (PET)
- UBIGEO: 060811

San José del Alto District is one of twelve districts of the province Jaén in Peru.
