= San Felipe District =

Coordinates: 5.7704°S 79.3152°W

San Felipe
- District
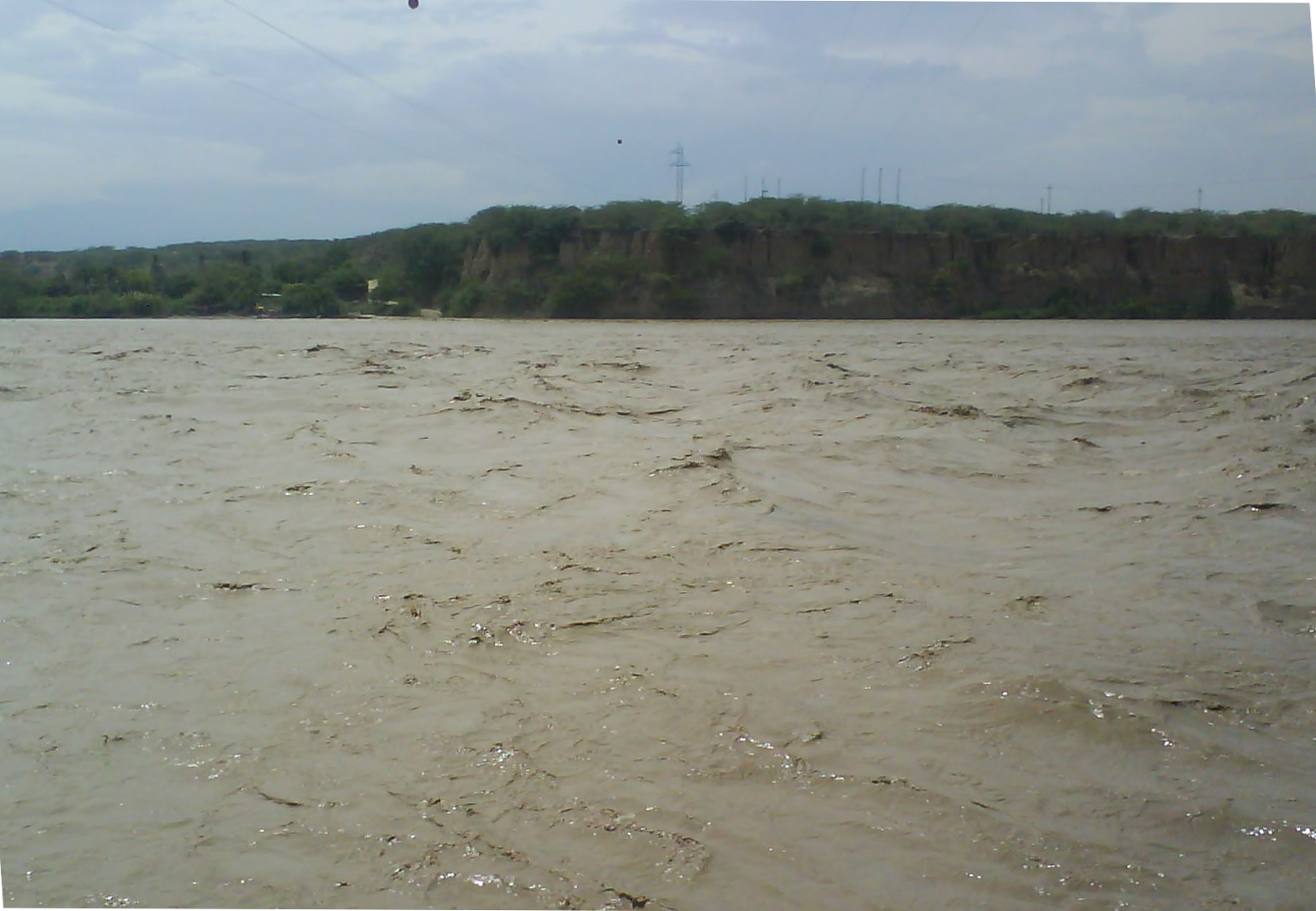
- Interactive map of San Felipe
- Country: Peru
- Region: Cajamarca
- Province: Jaén
- Founded: January 2, 1857
- Capital: San Felipe

Government
  - Mayor: Carlos Ovidio Palacios Torres

Area
  - Total: 255.49 km^{2} (98.65 sq mi)
- Elevation: 1,850 m (6,070 ft)

Population (2005 census)
  - Total: 5,423
  - Density: 21.23/km^{2} (54.97/sq mi)
- Time zone: UTC-5 (PET)
- UBIGEO: 060810

San Felipe District is one of twelve districts of the province Jaén in Peru.
