= Bellavista District, Jaén =

Coordinates: 5.6631°S 78.6792°W

Bellavista
- District
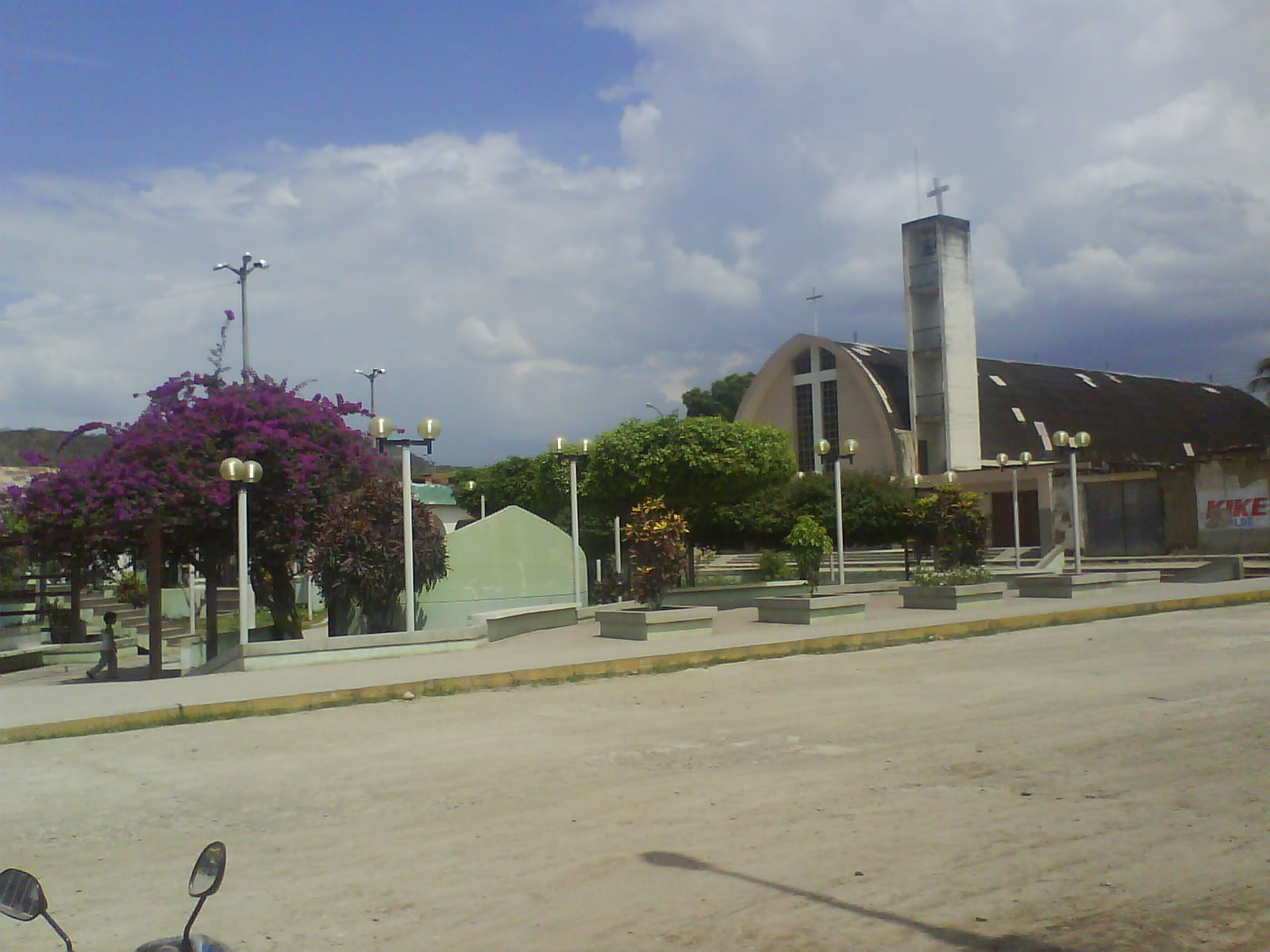
- Interactive map of Bellavista
- Country: Peru
- Region: Cajamarca
- Province: Jaén
- Founded: January 2, 1857
- Capital: Bellavista

Government
  - Mayor: Segundo Francisco Cotrina Delgado

Area
  - Total: 870.55 km^{2} (336.12 sq mi)
- Elevation: 421 m (1,381 ft)

Population (2005 census)
  - Total: 17,428
  - Density: 20.020/km^{2} (51.850/sq mi)
- Time zone: UTC-5 (PET)
- UBIGEO: 060802

Bellavista District is one of twelve districts of the province Jaén in Peru.
