= Huarango District =

Coordinates: 5.2717°S 78.7747°W

Huarango
- District
- Interactive map of Huarango
- Country: Peru
- Region: Cajamarca
- Province: San Ignacio
- Founded: May 12, 1965
- Capital: Huarango

Government
  - Mayor: Sixto Coronel Infante

Area
  - Total: 922.35 km^{2} (356.12 sq mi)
- Elevation: 750 m (2,460 ft)

Population (2005 census)
  - Total: 20,692
  - Density: 22.434/km^{2} (58.104/sq mi)
- Time zone: UTC-5 (PET)
- UBIGEO: 060903

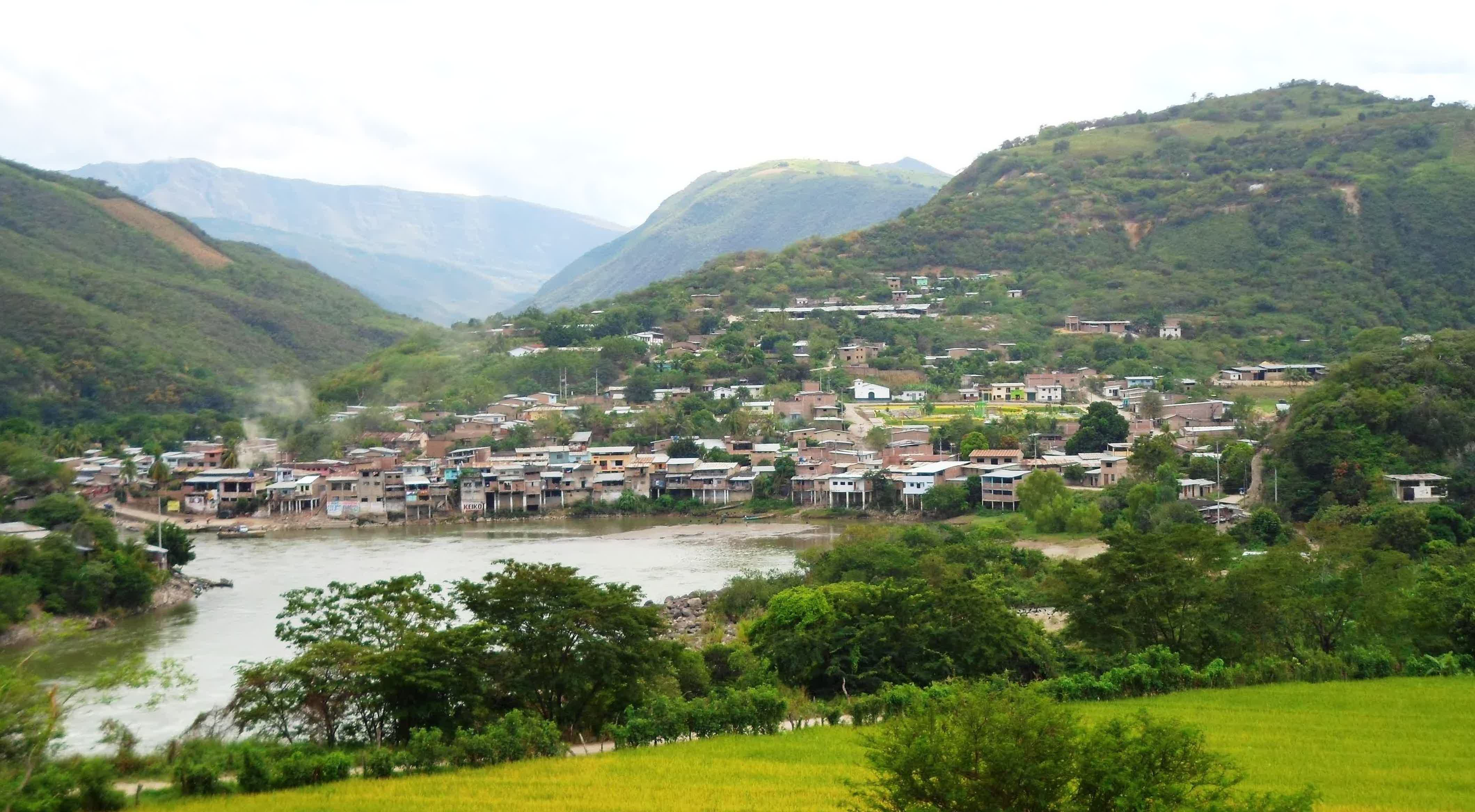
Puerto Ciruelo, Peru

Huarango District is one of seven districts of the province San Ignacio in Peru.
