= Lake Casa Blanca =

- Location within Texas Location within the United States
- Location: Laredo, Texas
- Coordinates: 27°32′01″N 99°26′55″W
- Type: Recreational reservoir
- Primary inflows: Chacon Creek; San Ygnacio Creek
- Primary outflows: Chacon Creek
- Basin countries: United States
- Surface area: 1,680 acres (680 ha)
- Max. depth: 36 ft (11 m)
- Water volume: 20,000 acre⋅ft (0.025 km^{3})
- Surface elevation: 440 ft (130 m)

Lake Casa Blanca is a reservoir on the Chacon Creek, 5 miles (8 km) northeast of downtown Laredo, Texas, United States. The reservoir was formed in 1951 by the construction of a dam to provide recreational opportunities for the residents of Webb County. The current dam is the second built across the creek - a previous dam built in 1946 failed the following year during the initial attempted impounding of a reservoir. There are residential properties along the lake as well as a Texas state park. Surrounding the lake is a 525-acre (212 ha) park that was operated jointly by the City of Laredo and Webb County before it was leased by the state in 1990 and opened in March 1991 as the Lake Casa Blanca International State Park. Lake Casa Blanca is fed by the Chacon Creek and San Ygnacio Creek.

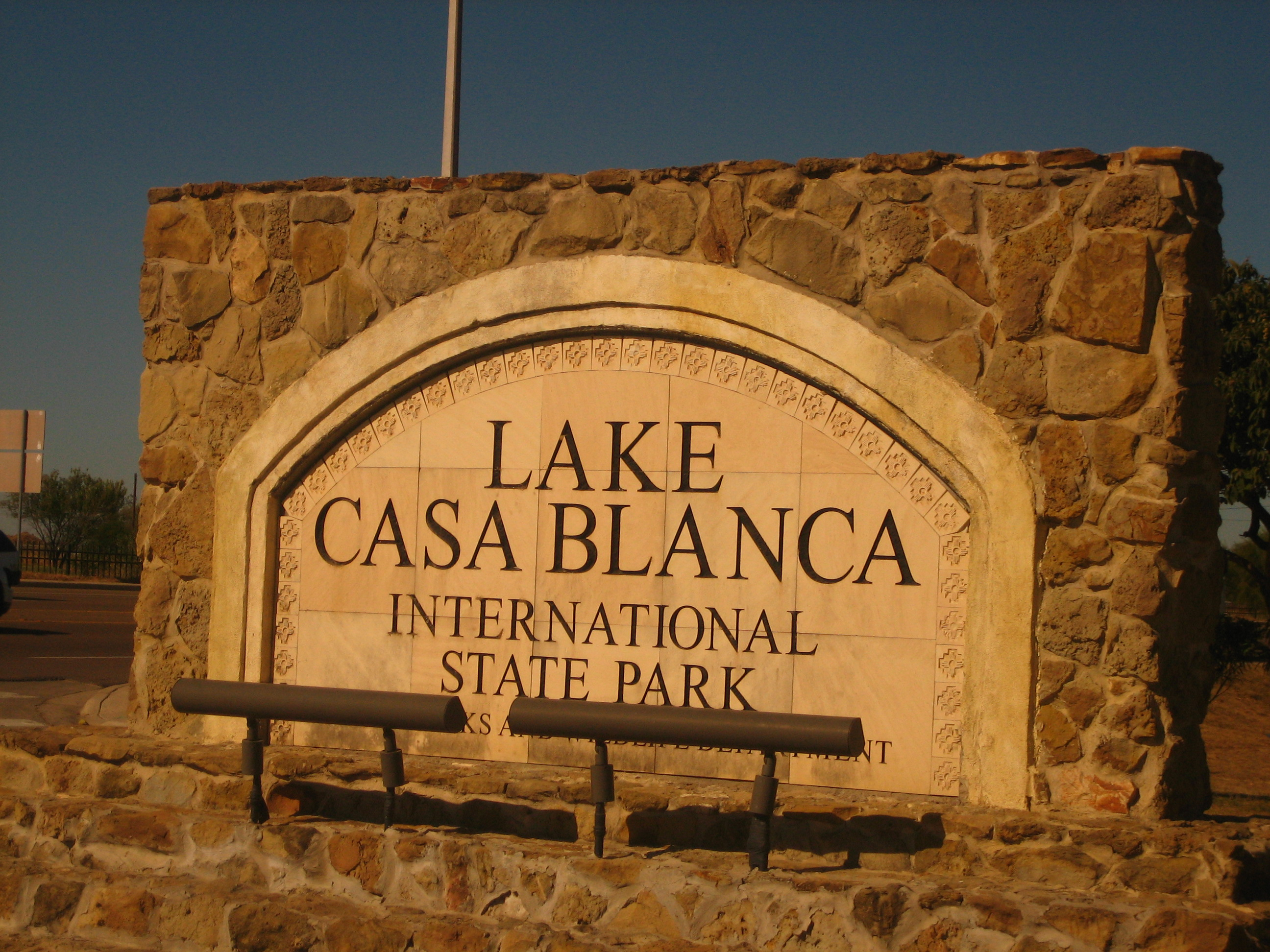
Entrance sign to Lake Casa Blanca International State Park off the Bob Bullock Loop in Laredo

== Fish and plant life ==
Lake Casa Blanca has been stocked with species of fish intended to improve the utility of the reservoir for recreational fishing. Fish present in Lake Casa Blanca include carp, hybrid striped bass, catfish, and largemouth bass.

== Recreational uses ==
Recreational uses of the park include cooking out, camping, picnicking, swimming, water skiing, boating, mountain biking, and the most popular recreational use of the lake is fishing. Boat ramps are available throughout the lake. Lake Casa Blanca formerly supplied water to the Casa Blanca Golf Course nearby until drought conditions forced alternative means to be explored.
