= San José de Lourdes District =

Coordinates: 5.1052°S 78.9134°W

San José de Lourdes
- District
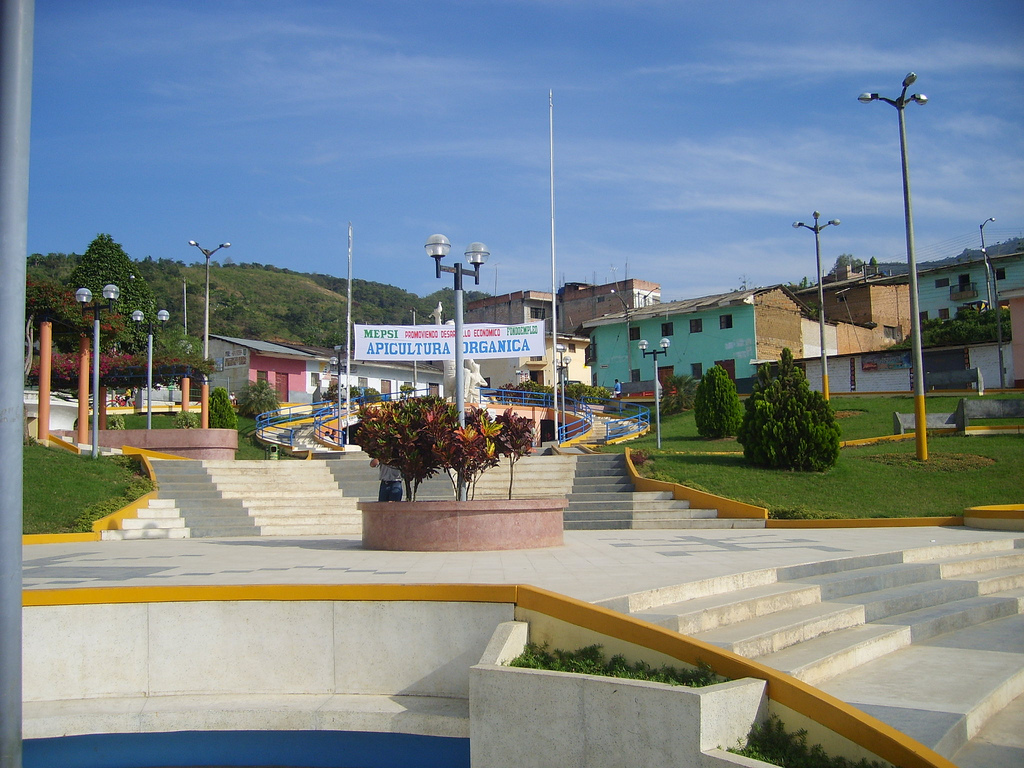
- Main square at San Ignacio in San Ignacio District, Peru
- Interactive map of San José de Lourdes
- Country: Peru
- Region: Cajamarca
- Province: San Ignacio
- Founded: December 28, 1943
- Capital: San José de Lourdes

Government
  - Mayor: José Wilfredo Liza Quesquen

Area
  - Total: 1,482.75 km^{2} (572.49 sq mi)
- Elevation: 1,180 m (3,870 ft)

Population (2005 census)
  - Total: 18,570
  - Density: 12.52/km^{2} (32.44/sq mi)
- Time zone: UTC-5 (PET)
- UBIGEO: 060906

San José de Lourdes District is one of seven districts of the province San Ignacio in Peru.
