= Las Pirias District =

Coordinates: 5.6267°S 78.8526°W

Las Pirias
- District
- Flag Coat of arms
- Anthem: Anthem of Cajamarca Region
- Interactive map of Las Pirias
- Country: Peru
- Region: Cajamarca
- Province: Jaén
- Founded: January 4, 1985
- Capital: Las Pirias

Area
  - Total: 60.41 km^{2} (23.32 sq mi)
- Elevation: 1,625 m (5,331 ft)

Population (2005 census)
  - Total: 3,899
  - Density: 64.54/km^{2} (167.2/sq mi)
- Time zone: UTC-5 (PET)
- UBIGEO: 060806

Las Pirias District is one of twelve districts of the province Jaén in Peru.
