= Pucará District, Jaén =

Coordinates: 6.0390°S 79.1295°W

Pucará Pukara
- District
- Interactive map of Pucará
- Country: Peru
- Region: Cajamarca
- Province: Jaén
- Founded: February 2, 1956
- Capital: Pucará

Area
  - Total: 240.3 km^{2} (92.8 sq mi)
- Elevation: 903 m (2,963 ft)

Population (2005 census)
  - Total: 7,046
  - Density: 29.32/km^{2} (75.94/sq mi)
- Time zone: UTC-5 (PET)
- UBIGEO: 060808

Pucará District is one of twelve districts of the province Jaén in Peru.
