= Huabal District =

Coordinates: 5.6117°S 78.9007°W

Huabal
- District
- Interactive map of Huabal
- Country: Peru
- Region: Cajamarca
- Province: Jaén
- Founded: January 3, 1985
- Capital: Huabal

Area
  - Total: 80.69 km^{2} (31.15 sq mi)
- Elevation: 1,785 m (5,856 ft)

Population (2005 census)
  - Total: 7,901
  - Density: 97.92/km^{2} (253.6/sq mi)
- Time zone: UTC-5 (PET)
- UBIGEO: 060805

Huabal District is one of twelve districts of the province Jaén in Peru's Cajamarca region.
