= Sallique District =

Coordinates: 5.6559°S 79.3160°W

Sallique
- District
- Interactive map of Sallique
- Country: Peru
- Region: Cajamarca
- Province: Jaén
- Founded: January 2, 1857
- Capital: Sallique

Area
  - Total: 373.89 km^{2} (144.36 sq mi)
- Elevation: 1,675 m (5,495 ft)

Population (2005 census)
  - Total: 7,908
  - Density: 21.15/km^{2} (54.78/sq mi)
- Time zone: UTC-5 (PET)
- UBIGEO: 060809

Sallique District is one of twelve districts of the province Jaén in Peru.
