= San Ygnacio Creek =

- Map

Physical characteristics
- Source
  - location: Webb County, Texas
  - elevation: 516 ft (160 m) at source to 445 ft (140 m) at mouth
- Mouth
  - location: Lake Casa Blanca at Laredo, Texas
- Length: 12 mi (19 km)

San Ygnacio Creek is a small stream of water located in Webb County, Texas which runs through Laredo, Texas. The creek is formed 11 miles (18 km) northwest of Laredo, Texas and runs southwest for 12 mi (19 km) until the creek connects to Chacon Creek which then feeds into Lake Casa Blanca shortly after. The terrain surrounding the creek is mostly clay. The vegetation surrounding the creek is mostly made up of mesquite, cacti, and grasses. San Ygnacio Creek does not cross any major highway.

== Coordinates ==
- Source: 27°37′52.38″N 99°20′26.64″W Webb County, Texas
- Mouth: 27°34′02.54″N 99°25′12.69″W Casa Blanca Lake at Laredo, Texas

== See also ==
- List of tributaries of the Rio Grande
- List of rivers of Texas
