= Pongo de Rentema =

Feature of the Marañón River, Peru

- Canyon
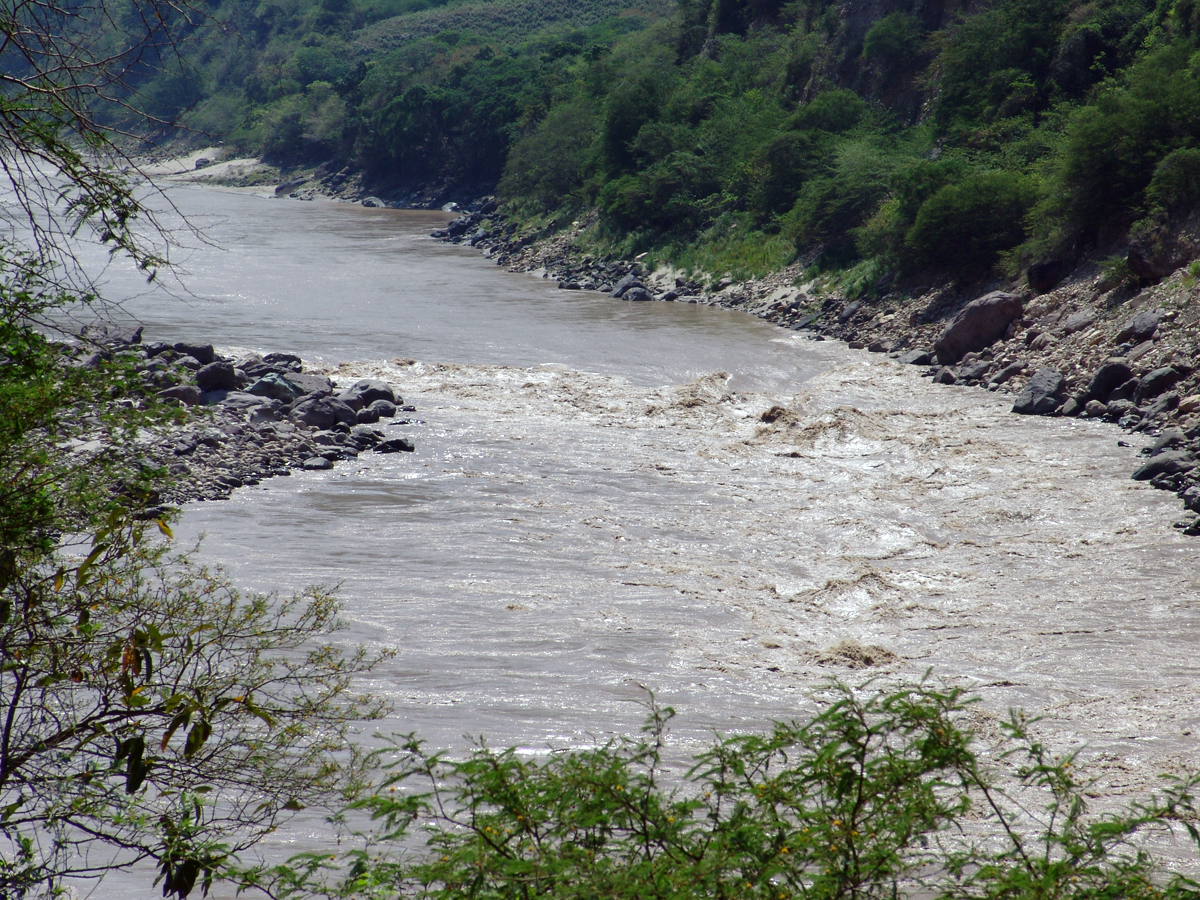

- Coordinates: 5°29′45″S 78°33′30″W
- Location: Department of Amazonas, Peru

Dimensions
  - Length: 2.4 kilometres (1.5 mi)

The Pongo de Rentema is a gorge in northwest Peru, located 14 kilometres from the city of Bagua, in the province of the same name in Amazonas Department. The Marañón River runs through this gorge (and water gap) before it reaches the Amazon Basin. It is considered a tourist attraction.

It is considered a sacred location by the Aguaruna people.

== See also ==
- Pongo de Manseriche
- Bracamoros, a historical region located nearby
