= Colasay District =

Coordinates: 5.9779°S 79.0689°W

Colasay
- District
- Interactive map of Colasay
- Country: Peru
- Region: Cajamarca
- Province: Jaén
- Capital: Colasay

Government
  - Mayor: Manuel Jesús Meniz Arnao

Area
  - Total: 735.73 km^{2} (284.07 sq mi)
- Elevation: 1,775 m (5,823 ft)

Population (2005 census)
  - Total: 12,088
  - Density: 16.430/km^{2} (42.553/sq mi)
- Time zone: UTC-5 (PET)
- UBIGEO: 060804

Colasay District is one of twelve districts of the province Jaén in Peru.
