= Namballe District =

Coordinates: 5.0034°S 79.0885°W

Namballe
- District
- Interactive map of Namballe
- Country: Peru
- Region: Cajamarca
- Province: San Ignacio
- Founded: December 28, 1943
- Capital: Namballe

Area
  - Total: 684.3 km^{2} (264.2 sq mi)
- Elevation: 1,120 m (3,670 ft)

Population (2017 census)
  - Total: 12,501
  - Density: 18.27/km^{2} (47.31/sq mi)
- Time zone: UTC-5 (PET)
- UBIGEO: 060905

Namballe District is one of seven districts of the province San Ignacio in Peru.
