= Chinchipe River =

River on the border between Ecuador and Peru

Coordinates: 5°31′S 78°33′W

The Chinchipe River is a river on the border between Ecuador and Peru. It rises in Ecuador, in the Zamora-Chinchipe Province, in the Podocarpus National Park. Then it flows through the Piura Region, and the Cajamarca Region in the San Ignacio Province of Peru. The river flows into the Maranon River.

The basin formed by the river covers an area of 9,686.96 km2.

The river originates in Ecuador at the confluence of the Palanda and Numbala rivers. It changes its name when crossing the border into Peru. In Ecuador and Peru, the river is also known as Canananbo, Chuquimayo, or Mayo.

One of the oldest cultures of the Andes developed in its basin. This is now known as Mayo-Chinchipe culture.

Mayo River (Peru) is also a small river in the same general area.

== Tributaries ==
The main tributaries that form the water catchment area of Chinchipe river are:

- In the province of Zamora Chinchipe (Ecuador):
  - River Palanda
  - River Numbala
  - Isimanchi river
  - Canchis river
- In the department of Cajamarca (Peru):
  - River Chirinos
  - River Tabaconas

== See also ==
- Zamora, Ecuador
- Yacurí National Park
