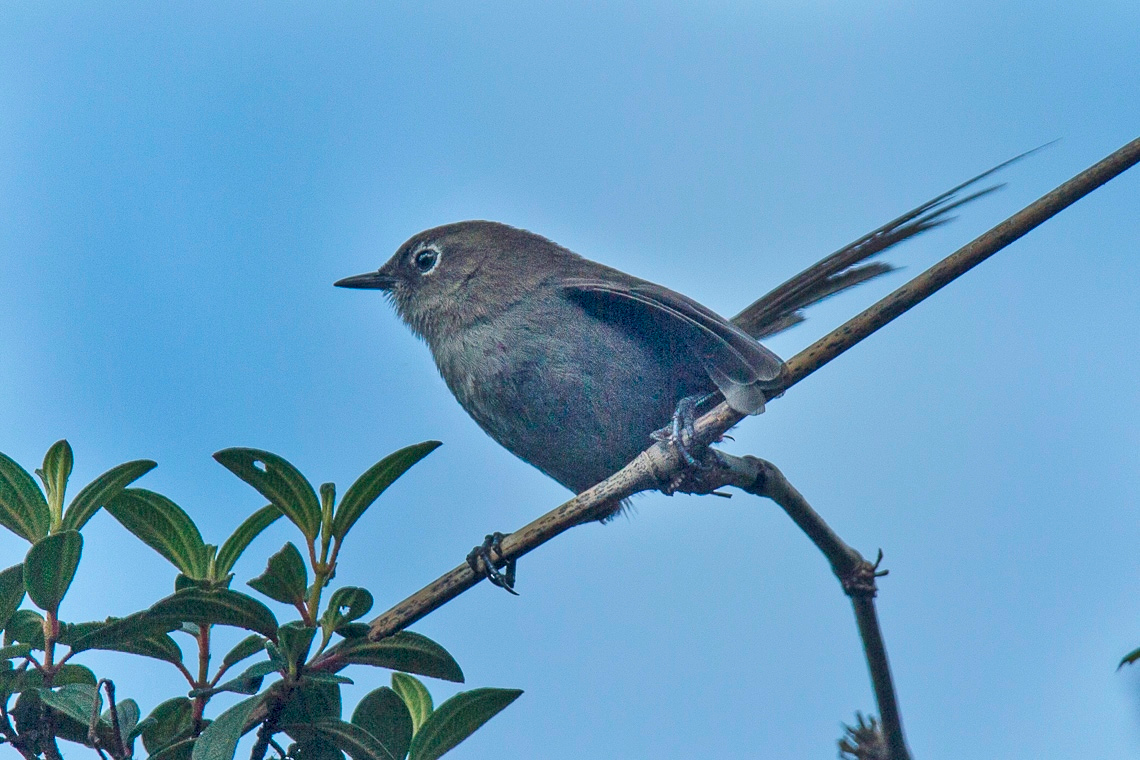

Conservation status
- Least Concern (IUCN 3.1)

Scientific classification
- Kingdom: Animalia
- Phylum: Chordata
- Class: Aves
- Order: Passeriformes
- Family: Furnariidae
- Genus: Asthenes
- Species: A. griseomurina

Binomial name
- Asthenes griseomurina (Sclater, PL, 1882)

Synonyms
- Schizoeaca griseomurina

= Mouse-colored thistletail =

Species of bird

The mouse-colored thistletail (Asthenes griseomurina) is a species of bird in the Furnariinae subfamily of the ovenbird family Furnariidae. It is found in Ecuador and Peru.

== Taxonomy and systematics ==
The mouse-colored thistletail and many other thistletails were previously treated as subspecies of the white-chinned thistletail (A. fuliginosa). All of them were in genus Schizoeaca but genetic data showed that the genus is embedded within Asthenes. The mouse-colored thistletail possibly should again be treated as a fifth subspecies of the white-chinned. The mouse-colored thistletail is monotypic.

== Description ==
The mouse-colored thistletail is 18 to 21 cm (7.1 to 8.3 in) long and weighs 15.5 to 19 g (0.55 to 0.67 oz). The sexes have the same plumage. Adults have a faint light gray-brown supercilium and a white eyering on an otherwise gray face. Their crown, back, rump, wings, and tail are dull olive-brown. Their tail is long and deeply forked with few barbs at the feather ends that give a ragged appearance. Their throat is pale gray or grayish brown (often with faint white streaks on the chin) and the rest of their underparts are pale grayish brown. Their iris is brown, their maxilla dark gray, their mandible paler but variable, and their legs and feet blue-gray.

== Distribution and habitat ==
The mouse-colored thistletail is found on both slopes of the Andes from Ecuador's Azuay and Morona-Santiago provinces south into far northern Peru's departments of Piura and Cajamarca, and also in the separate Cordillera del Cóndor in Amazonas Department. It inhabits páramo grasslands, the tree line ecotone between them and cloudforest, and Polylepis woodlands. In Ecuador it mostly ranges between 2,800 and 4,000 m (9,200 and 13,100 ft) of elevation but occurs locally as low as 2,500 m (8,200 ft). In Peru's Andes it occurs between 2,900 and 3,300 m (9,500 and 10,800 ft) and at about 2,150 m (7,100 ft) in the Cordillera del Cóndor.

== Behavior ==
=== Movement ===
The mouse-colored thistletail is a year-round resident throughout its range.

=== Feeding ===
The mouse-colored thistletail's diet has not been detailed but it is known to be mostly arthropods. It usually forages in pairs and only rarely joins mixed-species feeding flocks. It feeds close to the ground, gleaning prey from foliage and small branches.

=== Breeding ===
Nothing is known about the mouse-colored thistletail's breeding biology.

=== Vocalization ===
The mouse-colored thistletail's song has been described as "a trill increasing in speed and amplitude, and slightly descending in pitch, lasting c. 2 s and repeated every 6 s kee kee-keekeekrkrrr...rrrrrr". Another source describes it as "a series of notes that accelerates into a trill, the first notes inflected 'sweeí, sweeí, sweeí, swi, ti-ti-titi-trrrrr' ". One call is "a high-pitched but descending pseeeeuw". Others are "a loud riek, tzeeek, or weeek" and "a rising whiny wee? and pee".

== Status ==
The IUCN has assessed the mouse-colored thistletail as being of Least Concern. It has a small range and an unknown population size that is believed to be decreasing. No immediate threats have been identified. It is considered uncommon to fairly common in Ecuador and fairly common in Peru. "Human activity probably has little direct effect on the Mouse-colored Thistletail, other than the local effects of habitat destruction."
