= Tabaconas District =

Coordinates: 5.3137°S 79.2816°W

Tabaconas
- District
- Interactive map of Tabaconas
- Country: Peru
- Region: Cajamarca
- Province: San Ignacio
- Founded: February 11, 1855
- Capital: Tabaconas

Area
  - Total: 791.02 km^{2} (305.41 sq mi)
- Elevation: 1,892 m (6,207 ft)

Population (2005 census)
  - Total: 15,927
  - Density: 20.135/km^{2} (52.149/sq mi)
- Time zone: UTC-5 (PET)
- UBIGEO: 060907

Tabaconas District is one of seven districts of the province San Ignacio in Peru.
