= Yacurí National Park =

National park in Ecuador, South America

- Parque Nacional Yacurí
- IUCN category II (national park)
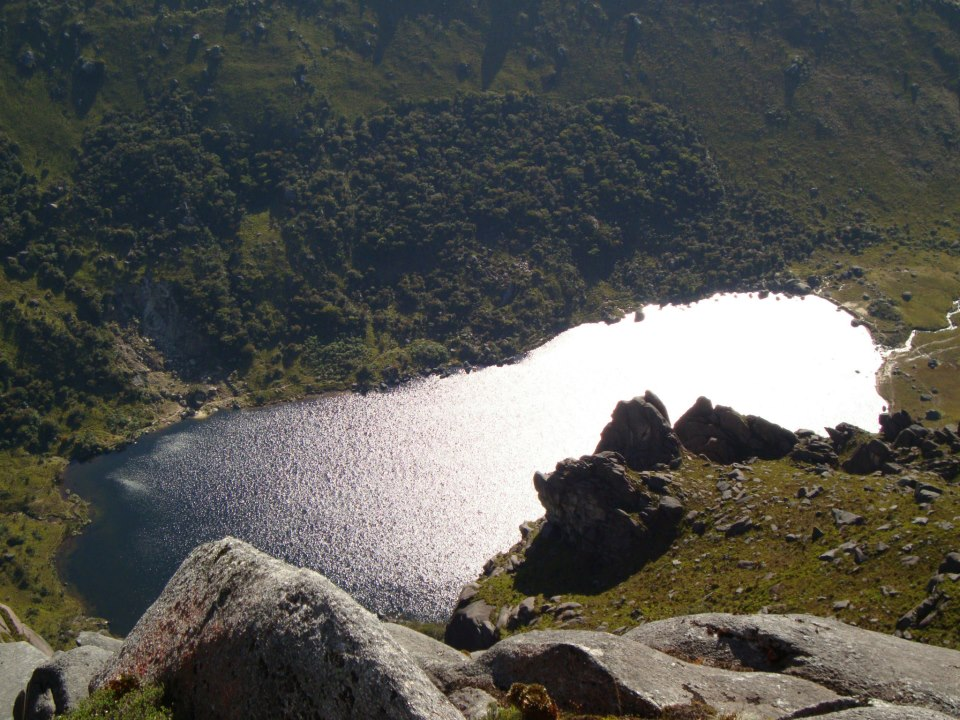
- Laguna Negra ("black lake"), Yacurí National Park

- Location within Ecuador
- Location: Zamora Chinchipe and Loja, Ecuador
- Nearest city: Amaluza
- Coordinates: 4.706°S 79.365°W
- Area: 431 km^{2} (166 mi^{2})
- Established: 30 December 2009
- Website: http://www.ambiente.gob.ec/?q=node/236&page=0,0

Yacurí National Park (Spanish: Parque Nacional Yacurí) is a 431-square-kilometre (166 mi^{2}) National Park in Ecuador located on the border between the provinces Loja and Zamora Chinchipe. It is part of a larger Protected Forest of 733 km^{2} (283 mi^{2}). It was founded in 2009. The headwaters for both the Chinchipe-Mayo (east) and Catamayo-Chira (west) water basins are in the park.

== Flora ==
The Park contains a variety of ecosystems. Most of the park is in one of the following:

- Southern Andean Shrub Páramo (Páramo Arbustivo de los Andes del Sur): 42.6%
- Eastern Andean Upper Montane Evergreen Forest (Bosque Siempreverde Montano Alto de los Andes Orientales): 22%
- Southern Andean Dry Montane Shrubland (Matorral Seco Montano de los Andes del Sur): 15.1%
- Eastern Andean Cloud Forest (Bosque de Neblina Montano de los Andes Orientales): 14%

The park contains 280 plant species. 32 of them are endemic to the park. Two of the species are endangered and 11 are vulnerable.

== Fauna ==
There are 18 species of mammals in the park of which five are endangered. Mammals include the vulnerable Cougar (puma concolor), the endangered Mountain Tapir(Tapirus pinchaque) and the endangered Spectacled bear (Tremarctos ornatus). There are 111 bird species of which four are endangered and 11 amphibian species of which four are endangered.

== Attractions ==
The national park has over 46 high-altitude lakes. The most commonly visited lakes are:

- "Laguna Negra": an extremely deep lake in the caldera of an extinguished volcano. It is known for its medicinal waters and is often visited by nearby traditional priests (or medicine men). It can be reached by a 50-minute hike from the refuge near the Lagunas Jimbura entrance (near the town of Jimbura, in the Espindola Municipality). From the lake, the highest peak in Loja can be reached (though there is no trail).
- "Laguna Yacurí", the largest lake in the park and the park's namesake. It can be reached by a five-hour hike. The trail leaves from along the road from Espindola towards the park.
- Inca Trail: The Inca Trail also passes through the park and there are archeological ruins including petroglyphs, plazas and cemeteries on the western side of the Protected Forest (which is the North side of the park).
