= Pomahuaca District =

Coordinates: 5.9305°S 79.2294°W

Pomahuaca
- District
- Interactive map of Pomahuaca
- Country: Peru
- Region: Cajamarca
- Province: Jaén
- Founded: December 28, 1943
- Capital: Pomahuaca

Government
  - Mayor: Huwer Eduardo Faya Castro

Area
  - Total: 732.8 km^{2} (282.9 sq mi)
- Elevation: 1,075 m (3,527 ft)

Population (2005 census)
  - Total: 9,146
  - Density: 12.48/km^{2} (32.33/sq mi)
- Time zone: UTC-5 (PET)
- UBIGEO: 060807

Pomahuaca District is one of twelve districts of the province Jaén in Peru.

== See also ==
- Inka Tampu
