= Ingatambo =

Archaeological site in Peru

- Location within Peru
- 05°57′33.5″S 79°13′33.04″W
- Type: Settlement
- Location: Jaén Province, Cajamarca

Ingatambo (possibly from Quechua inka Inca, tampu inn) is an archaeological site in Peru. It is situated in the Cajamarca Region, Jaén Province, Pomahuaca District.
