= San Ignacio District, Peru =

Coordinates: 5.1451°S 79.0005°W

San Ignacio District
- District
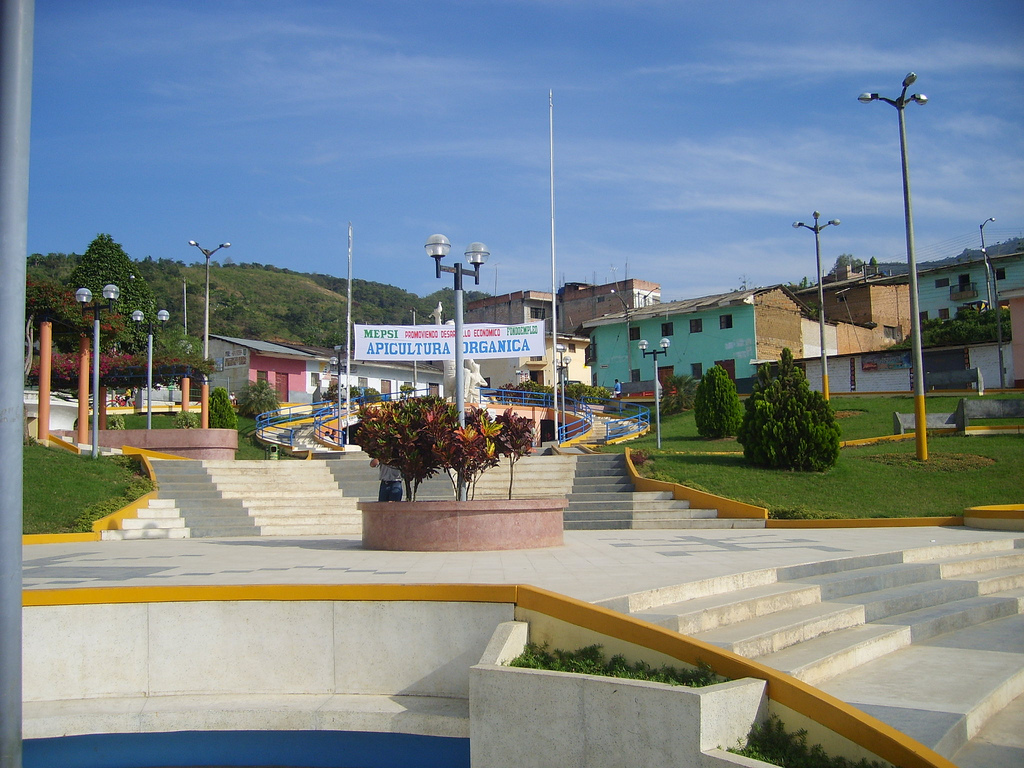
- Main square at San Ignacio de la Frontera
- Interactive map of San Ignacio District
- Country: Peru
- Region: Cajamarca
- Province: San Ignacio
- Founded: January 2, 1857
- Capital: San Ignacio de la Frontera

Government
  - Mayor: Carlos Alfonso Martinez Solano

Area
  - Total: 381.88 km^{2} (147.44 sq mi)
- Elevation: 1,324 m (4,344 ft)

Population (2005 census)
  - Total: 31,771
  - Density: 83.196/km^{2} (215.48/sq mi)
- Time zone: UTC-5 (PET)
- UBIGEO: 060901

San Ignacio District is one of seven districts of the province San Ignacio in Peru.
