= La Coipa District =

Coordinates: 5.3932°S 78.9064°W

La Coipa
- District
- Interactive map of La Coipa
- Country: Peru
- Region: Cajamarca
- Province: San Ignacio
- Founded: May 12, 1965
- Capital: La Coipa

Government
  - Mayor: Samuel Sanchez Rivera

Area
  - Total: 376.09 km^{2} (145.21 sq mi)
- Elevation: 1,500 m (4,900 ft)

Population (2005 census)
  - Total: 18,422
  - Density: 48.983/km^{2} (126.87/sq mi)
- Time zone: UTC-5 (PET)
- UBIGEO: 060904

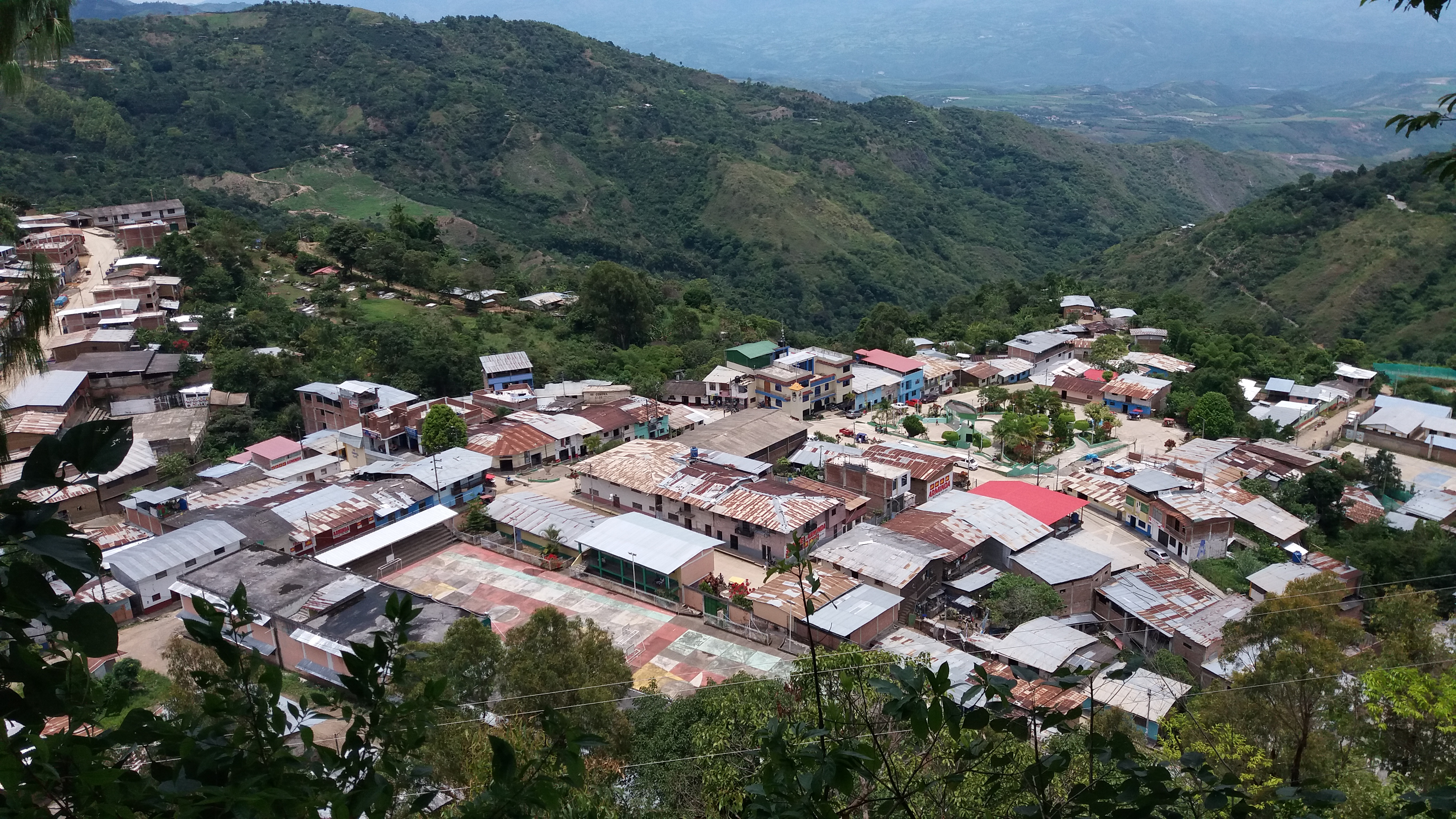
La Coipa, panoramic view

La Coipa District is one of seven districts of the province San Ignacio in Peru.
