= Chacon Creek =

River in Texas, US

Physical characteristics
- Source
  - location: Webb, Texas
  - elevation: 652 ft (200 m)
- Mouth
  - location: Rio Grande at Laredo, Texas
  - elevation: 345 ft (110 m)
- Length: 20 mi (32 km)

Chacon Creek is a small stream of water located in Webb County, Texas, US, which runs through Laredo. The creek is formed 6 miles from Webb and runs southwest for 20 miles until it connects to the Rio Grande. Chacon was dammed in 1951 in east Laredo to form Lake Casa Blanca, a 1,680 acres (6.8 km^{2}) lake. The terrain surrounding the creek is mostly clay. The vegetation surrounding the creek is mostly made up of mesquite, cacti and grasses. Chacon Creek is cross by several highways in Laredo, including United States Route 59, Texas State Highway Loop 20, Business United States Route 59, Texas State Highway Spur 400, Texas State Highway 359 and United States Route 83.

== Co-ordinates ==
- Source: 27°42′52.69″N 99°22′02.32″W near Webb, Texas
- Mouth: 27°29′17.55″N 99°28′45.75″W Rio Grande at Laredo, Texas

== See also ==
- List of tributaries of the Rio Grande
- List of rivers of Texas
