= Chirinos District =

Coordinates: 5.3051°S 78.9000°W

Chirinos
- District
- Interactive map of Chirinos
- Country: Peru
- Region: Cajamarca
- Province: San Ignacio
- Capital: Chirinos

Government
  - Mayor: Roger Nelson Pintado Ocupa

Area
  - Total: 351.91 km^{2} (135.87 sq mi)
- Elevation: 1,858 m (6,096 ft)

Population (2005 census)
  - Total: 13,640
  - Density: 38.76/km^{2} (100.4/sq mi)
- Time zone: UTC-5 (PET)
- UBIGEO: 060902

Chirinos District is one of seven districts of the province San Ignacio in Peru.
