= San Ignacio, Perú =

San Ignacio Perú
- Town
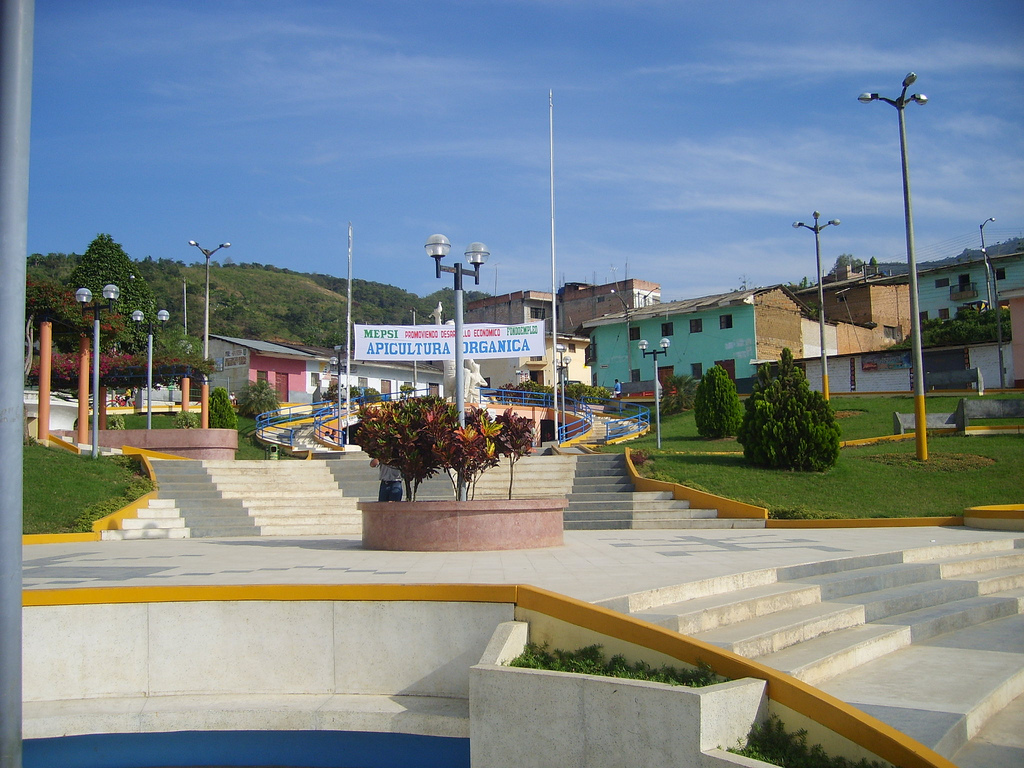
- Parade ground of San Ignacio

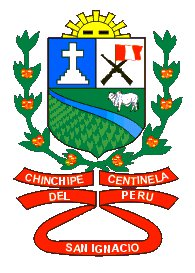
- Flag Coat of arms

- Location within Peru
- Coordinates: 5°08′44″S 79°00′06″W
- Country: Peru
- Region: Cajamarca Region
- Province: San Ignacio Province
- Established: creation May 12, 1965

Government
  - Mayor: Reguberto García Ordóñez

Area
  - Total: 4,990 km^{2} (1,930 sq mi)
- Elevation: 1,260 m (4,130 ft)

Population (2005)
  - Total: 127,523
  - Density: 25.6/km^{2} (66.2/sq mi)
- Demonym: Sanignacino (a)
- Time zone: UTC-5 (PET)
  - Summer (DST): UTC-5 (PET)
- Postal code: 076
- Website: www.munisanignacio.gob.pe

The city of San Ignacio is the capital of San Ignacio, one of the thirteen provinces that make up the Department of Cajamarca, under the administration of the regional government of Cajamarca, in Peru. It borders the province of Zamora Chinchipe (Ecuador) to the north, the Department of Amazonas to the east, the province of Jaen to the south and the Department of Piura to the west. It is known as the land of coffee, honey and natural forests. Its population by economic activity agriculture which is based exclusively to coffee.

== History ==
In 1926 the negotiations for the creation of the province of San Ignacio for the effect of which was assigned a commission to travel to Lima began; the same that was composed by Father Juan Cabrera Arias, Donovan Bartolini Rangel and Luis Manuel Soto Adrianzén Salary Huaman, who appeared before the military junta led by Major General Ricardo Perez. The May 12, 1965, by Law No. 15560 created the province during the first government of President Fernando Belaunde.

== See also ==
- 2005 northern Peru earthquake
- Cajamarca Region
