= Santa Rosa District, Jaén =

Coordinates: 5.4516°S 78.6950°W

Santa Rosa District
- District
- Interactive map of Santa Rosa District
- Country: Peru
- Region: Cajamarca
- Province: Jaén
- Founded: December 28, 1943
- Capital: Santa Rosa

Government
  - Mayor: Herman Frailel Perez Davila

Area
  - Total: 282.8 km^{2} (109.2 sq mi)
- Elevation: 1,450 m (4,760 ft)

Population (2005 census)
  - Total: 12,025
  - Density: 42.52/km^{2} (110.1/sq mi)
- Time zone: UTC-5 (PET)
- UBIGEO: 060812

Santa Rosa District is one of twelve districts of the province Jaén in Peru.
