= Jaén province, Peru =

Coordinates: 5°42′S 78°48′W

Jaén
- Province
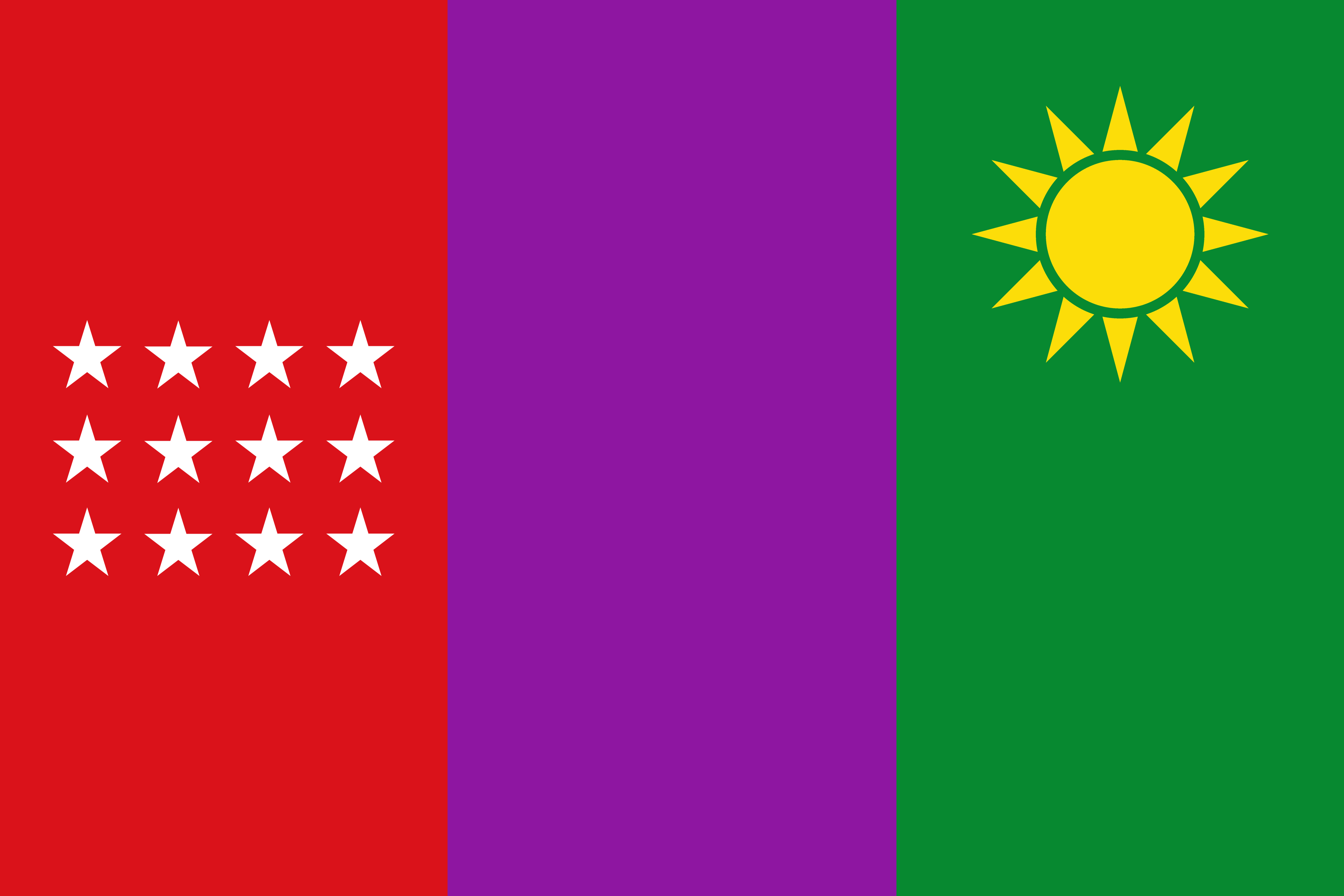
- Flag

- Location of Jaén in the Cajamarca Region
- Country: Peru
- Region: Cajamarca
- Founded: May 19, 1828
- Named for: Jaén, Spain
- Capital: Jaén

Government
  - Mayor: José Francisco Delgado Rivera (2019-2022)

Area
  - Total: 5,232.57 km^{2} (2,020.31 sq mi)

Population
  - Total: 185,432
  - Density: 35.4380/km^{2} (91.7841/sq mi)
- UBIGEO: 0608
- Website: www.munijaen.gob.pe

Jaén is one of the thirteen provinces in the Cajamarca Region of Peru. Geographically, the province has a mountainous terrain crisscrossed by the rivers of the Huancabamba-Chamaya Basin, which drain towards the Marañón River. Its weather is characterized by high temperatures all year long and heavy rains from October through March. Agriculture and husbandry absorb over half of the province workforce; rice and coffee are main crops.

== Geographical Location ==
The province of Jaén extends westward to the Peruvian Western Cordillera. The Marañón River flows along the eastern border of the province.

The province of Jaén borders the Amazonas Region to the east, the Cutervo Region to the south, the Lambayeque and Piura Regions to the west, and the San Ignacio Region and Ecuador to the north.

== Trade ==
The province of Jaén is a hub for coffee and rice, which is produced in the area.

== Boundaries ==
- North: San Ignacio Province
- East: Amazonas Region
- South: Cutervo Province
- West: Piura Region and Lambayeque Region

== Political division ==
The province is divided into twelve districts.

- Jaén (Jaén de Bracamoros)
- Bellavista (Bellavista)
- Chontali (Chontali)
- Colasay (Colasay)
- Huabal (Huabal)
- Las Pirias (Las Pirias)
- Pomahuaca (Pomahuaca)
- Pucará (Pucará)
- Sallique (Sallique)
- San Felipe (San Felipe)
- San José del Alto (San José del Alto)
- Santa Rosa (Santa Rosa)

== See also ==
- Inka Tampu
