= San Ignacio province =

Coordinates: 5°09′S 79°00′W

San Ignacio
- Province
- Flag Coat of arms

- Location of San Ignacio in the Cajamarca Region
- Country: Peru
- Region: Cajamarca
- Capital: San Ignacio de la Frontera

Government
  - Mayor: Reguberto García Ordóñez

Area
  - Total: 4,990.3 km^{2} (1,926.8 sq mi)
- Elevation: 1,324 m (4,344 ft)

Population
  - Total: 127,523
  - Density: 25.554/km^{2} (66.185/sq mi)
- UBIGEO: 0609
- Website: www.munisanignacio.gob.pe

San Ignacio is one of thirteen provinces located in the Cajamarca Region of Peru. The capital of this province is the city of San Ignacio.

== Boundaries ==
- North: Ecuador
- East: Amazonas Region
- South: province of Jaén
- West: Piura Region

== Political division ==
The province extends over an area of 4,990.30 square kilometers (1,926.77 sq mi) and is divided into seven districts:

- San Ignacio
- Chirinos
- Huarango
- La Coipa
- Namballe
- San José de Lourdes
- Tabaconas

== Population ==
The province has a population of 127,523 inhabitants as of census 2005.

== See also ==
- Cajamarca Region
- Peru
