= Cenepa River =

River in Ecuador and Peru

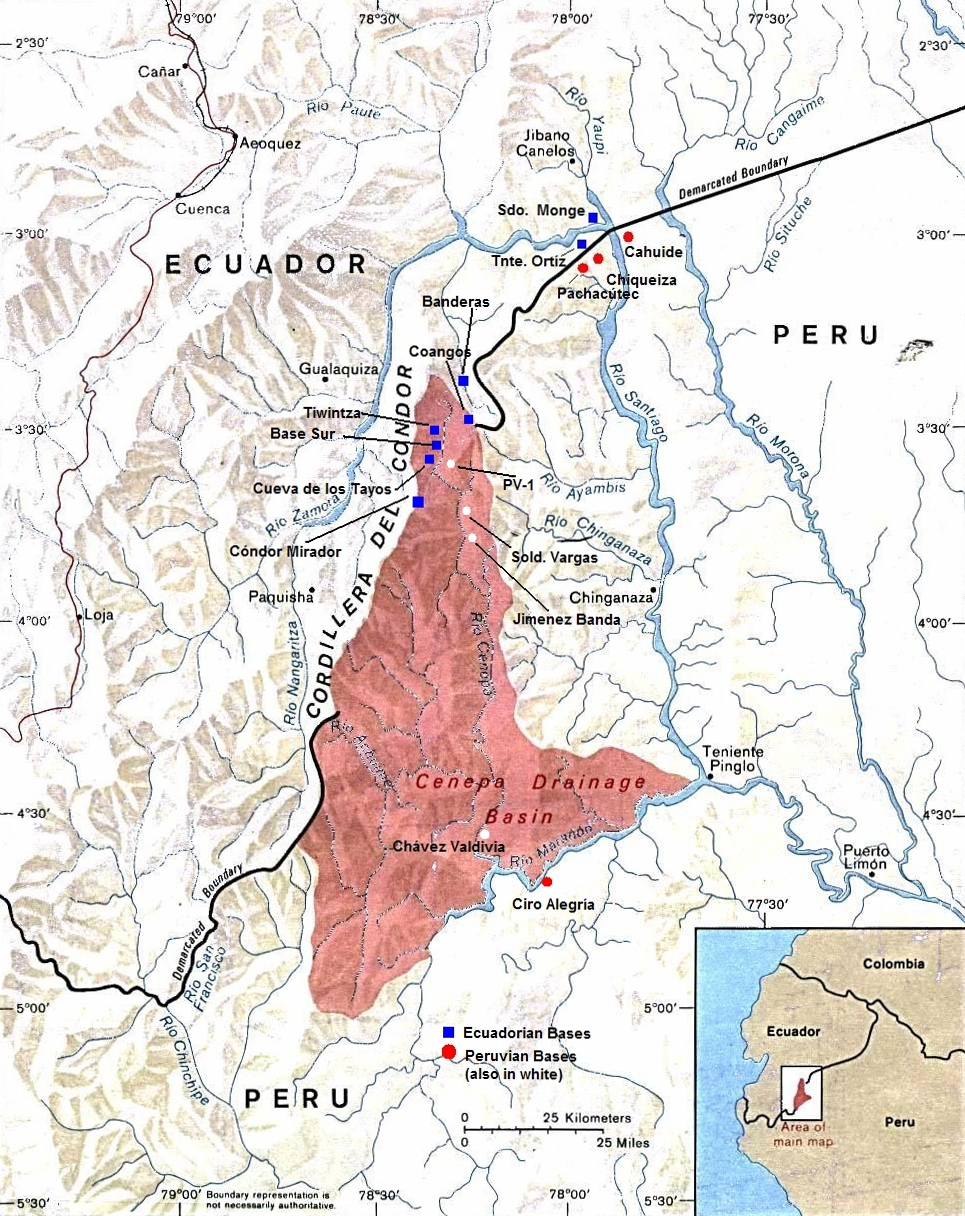
- Ecuadorian and Peruvian military outposts in the Cenepa valley, January 1995

Physical characteristics
- Mouth
  - coordinates: 4°39′4″S 78°8′53″W
- Length: 185 km (115 mi)

The Cenepa River is a 185-kilometre (115 mi) stretch of river whose basin borders Ecuador but is located completely in Peru, in the southeast side of the Cordillera del Cóndor mountain range in South America. Its drainage basin borders to the northwest with the Cordillera del Condor, borderline between Ecuador and Perú; to the east on the districts of Río Santiago and Nieva in Peru, on the south with the district of Imaza, and on the west with Ecuador. The River has been subject to several border disputes between Peru and Ecuador; the most notable was the Cenepa War in 1995. The Awajún (Aguaruna People), the locals around the Cenepa River Basin, have had issues with the legal certainty of the River due to its cultural significance and resources. The Cenepa River has been impacted by the consequences of military action in the region through skirmishes between Ecuadorian and Peruvian forces along with the establishment of military camps and outposts. Expansion of local communities and the influence of mining have to different degrees interrupted the natural habitats of local fauna and flora. The Cenepa River has had government intervention through the growing recognition of the importance of preservation. This was a direct result of the peace talks that followed the Cenepa War in 1995, also known as the Alto Cenepa War.

== Geographical region ==
The Cenepa River is a 185-km stretch of river where its basin borders Ecuador and Peru. The land around the Cenepa River Basin "presents a capricious topography that includes relatively broad inland valleys". For example, the Numpatkeim Valley, like similar valleys in the region that have narrow canyons and opportune farmland is not commonly found along many reaches of the river. Along the eastern banks of the Cenepa River are primarily tropical premontane rainforests where the Cenepa River Basin is noted as a treacherous region of steep valleys that offered limited access between the border. During the period of the 1943–1946 aerial survey, two aircraft and 14 men are recorded to be lost in accidents in the dense tropical rainforest encompassing the Cenepa River.

A network of rivers and streams as well as brooks follow through deeply dissected mountain systems within the regions. The water that originates in the Cordillera del Condor establishes a pivotal section of the subsystems that create the Cenepa river basin. The great multitude of limestone and sandstone structure in the region along with the presence of the vast number of streams have created hundreds of culturally significant waterfalls in the Cordillera del Condor and Cenepa regions. Caves which have been formed can take days to walk through, these are accessed through long narrow passages that are often 60 to 80 meters deep. These characteristics of the Cordillera del Condor and Cenepa region are the reason behind the conservation and preservation. The primary role of conservation in the region is to maintain the water cycles essential to the Cenepa River.

The 1946 United States Army Air Force accomplished the first aerial survey of the Cordillera del Condor zone including the Cenepa River. The results revealed for the first time the topographic contours, watershed and drainage of the Cenepa River which were unknown until this survey. Geographical understanding prior to this survey was limited; the survey verified that the Cenepa River was far longer than Ecuadorian cartography had initially recorded and believed.

== Territorial disputes ==
The Peruvian Government had a spoken pact of mutual understanding and cooperation with the local communities of the Cenepa River, primarily the Aguaruna People. The pact was enforced in 1940 by the military and remained until the end of the Cenepa War in 1995. As a result of the local communities' ability to produce food resources through small farms like animal breeding; such as chickens and farmland for bananas. This enabled the army to maintain logistical support through a reliable and steady supply of staples from the locals for their encampments established in isolated locations. The pact between the army and the Aguaruna resulted in the army receiving warnings from the locals, regarding military infiltrations from Ecuadorian forces. As the Cenepa River along the border is a region of extremely restricted access, traditional dirt roads is the one alternative option other than a helicopter flight. The Team, Organisation for the Development of Border Communities of EL Cenepa Research 2010 observed that the pact was the reason that the valleys in the Cenepa River Basin had no outside settlements and it was made possible to sustain territorial control and environment solidity for the traditional locals.

Large troop activity around the Cenepa River was evident during the disputes between Ecuador and Peru. In 1995, upwards of 3000 Ecuadorian troops where deployed in the region as well as 2000 Peruvian troops. The average skirmishes between these forces where between patrol units consisting of on average 40 men (Marcella 1995 p. 1). Increased troop activity around the Cenepa River resulted in the greater foot traffic and damages to its ecosystem. In addition with the clearing of tropical premontane rainforests for the establishment of multiple camps and military outposts. The territorial disputes have had many impacts in the Cenepa River as there are reports of landmines from the conflict that remain a problem in that area. The landmines remaining in the upper Cenepa, placed by Peruvian forces add to the significant dangers of the region. Airstrikes have impacted areas around the Cenepa river, primarily in east Cordillera del Condor.

== Legal certainty ==
The Cenepa River Basin has been the subject to territorial disputes between Ecuador and Peru as well as legal conflicts between the local inhabitants and the Peruvian government. In the 1970s the "first registrations and land titles where awarded to the communities that roughly corresponded to the locations of where the bilingual schools had been established in the 1960s". These communities where primarily located in the middle reaches of the Cenepa river including some in the lower reaches. The land tiles were given to fourteen local communities and had the common attempt to protect the land on the banks of the Cenepa river that were in the local vicinity of the established schools. This was in order to protect and preserve the local communities' right to fish and pan for alluvial gold. Including the right of access and ownership of inland areas. The end of the Cenepa War of 1995 was when the legal certainty of the land was recognised as an important verdict. Results were produced between 1997 and 1999, where many local Cenepa River communities were granted land titles as to maintain the integrity of the Cenepa River Basin. Overall, the legal certainty of the Cenepa River was an effort to recognise the traditional caretakers of the land. The Team, Organisation for the Development of Border Communities of EL Cenepa Research states that "by 1999 a total of 158, 910 hectares in the Cenepa River Basin had been awarded land tiles to the local communities".

== Local communities ==
The Cenepa River native inhabitants are the Aguaruna People. Traditionally, the "Aguaruna families within an endogamous nexus alternate the location of their homes and agricultural fields". These locations are rotated within the sub-basin they inhabit also interpreted as the same geographical region. The low population density of the traditional communities and their traditional movement of their settlements around their inhabited sub-basin, enable the soil fertility to periodically recover. This allows the Aguarana people to maintain the land and resources such as fruit trees. The traditional local communities main influence on the Cenepa River region was the continual rotation of their settlements which provided the basin the opportunity to recover and be maintained.

In the 1960s the first bilingual schools were established in the Cenepa River Basin region. this establishment contributed to the increasing formation of new population centres and existing communities consisting of relatives that lived traditionally in a widespread manner. The increasing populations concentrated around the lower and middle regions of the Cenepa and Canga rivers. The main populous communities are located in the middle reaches of the river. The increase in schools and other services to the region such as health posts has resulted in the population around the Cenepa River to rise. The Team Organisation for the Development of Border Communities of EL Cenepa Research 2010 states that the sizes of the local communities greatly varied from 50 to 3000 inhabitants. This resulted in the increase of small farms for animal breeding which was located closer to the local communities and farmland for food production through crops such as bananas and cocoa, located further from the community.

Bananas, cassava, plantains and Mauritian palm fruit are the most common food resources grown in the Cenepa river basin that the local communities eat, where meals are most commonly prepared through boiling. The land around the Cenepa River has many banana trees, maintained by the local communities. Chapo and pururuca are the names of drinks the local communities, primarily the Aguaruna people make from boiling ripe bananas.

== Local flora and fauna ==
In some regions vegetations is restricted to growing on average fifteen meters; a result of shallow soils over limestone and strong winds. Flowering and fruiting specimens of Cremastosperma yamayakatense grow up to heights of around 6 to 8 metres in the Cenepa River region in contrast to the Bagua and Condorcanqui provinces where the same species have been recorded having an average of 1.5 meters.

A vast number of frog species have been discovered around the basin, primarily in habitats that consisted of clear and black waters, including some lentic environments. It was observed that there is a great Otter presence in the region, this highlights the copiousness of fish in the upper stretches of the Cenepa river basin.
