= Palanda =

Palanda may refer to:

- Palanda Canton, a canton of Ecuador
- Palanda, Ecuador, a town in Palanda Parish (es:Palanda), in Palanda Canton
- Palanda, one of the names for Lasippa, a genus of Asian butterflies
- Hyloxalus cevallosi, common name Palanda rocket frog
