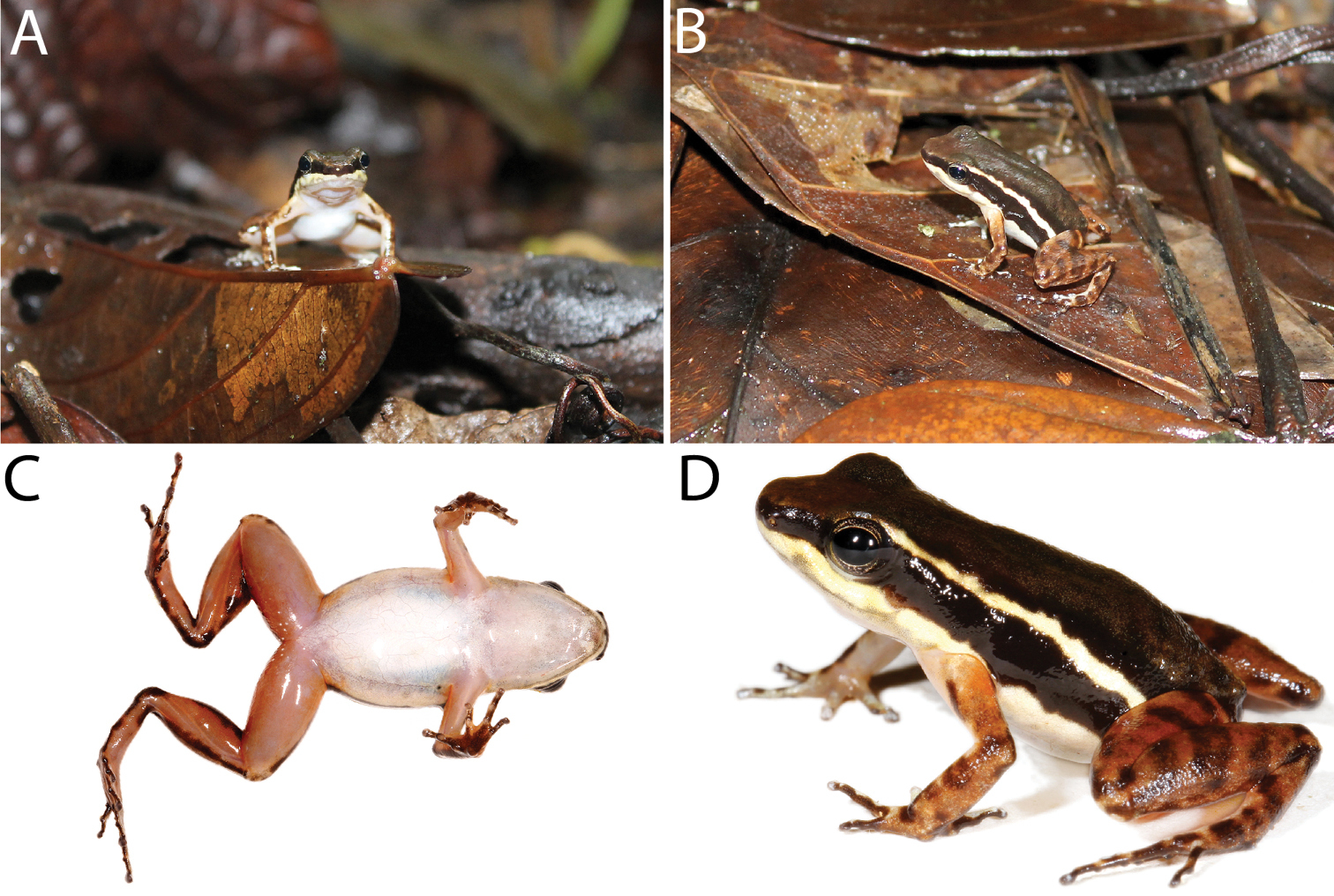

Scientific classification
- Kingdom: Animalia
- Phylum: Chordata
- Class: Amphibia
- Order: Anura
- Family: Dendrobatidae
- Genus: Leucostethus
- Species: L. siapida

Binomial name
- Leucostethus siapida Grant and Bolívar-García, 2021

= Leucostethus siapida =

Species of frog

Leucostethus siapida, also called the haunted cuilane, is a species of frog in the family Dendrobatidae. It was formally described in 2021 and is named after the Siapida indigenous group, who are native to the southern Chocó region of Colombia. It is endemic to Gorgona Island in the Cauca Department of Colombia, but phylogenetic evidence suggests that this is only a relict of a formerly more widespread range, and that the species may still be found on the mainland. It is a moderate-sized Leucostethus, with males reaching a maximum snout–vent length of 23.0 mm and females reaching a maximum snout–vent length of 25.8 mm. The dorsum is brown with blackish-brown blotches and the venter is silvery-white. There is a pale yellow oblique stripe along the sides.

The frog is active during the day in and on leaf litter, low vegetation, and low objects, such as rocks and logs, on the forest floor. The species has not been assessed by the IUCN, but the authors who described the species recommended that it be considered vulnerable due to its small known distribution.

== Taxonomy ==
Leucostethus siapida was formally described in 2021 based on an adult male specimen collected from near El Poblado, Gorgona Island in the Cauca Department, Colombia. The species is named after the Siapida indigenous group, who are native to the southern Chocó region of Colombia and who have visited Gorgona Island for centuries. The word means 'people of the arrow' or 'people of the wild cane' in the Siapidarã dialect of the Eperarã language within the Emberá language continuum. The species has the English common name haunted cuilane and the Spanish common name Cuilanes encantados.

Phylogenetic data suggests that Leucostethus siapida is part of the trans-Andean Leucostethus fraterdanieli group. Within the group, it is thought to be sister to Leucostethus bilsa, native to northwestern Ecuador. These two species split over three million years ago, although Gorgona Island has only been separated from the mainland for around 18–20 thousand years. Thus, it is thought that the isolation caused by the island was not a major factor in speciation and the Gorgona population of Leucostethus siapida is a relict of a formerly more widespread species. The species may also continue to survive on the mainland.

== Description ==
The species is a moderate-sized Leucostethus, with males reaching a maximum snout–vent length of 23.0 mm and females reaching a maximum snout–vent length of 25.8 mm. The dorsum is brown with blackish-brown blotches. The dorsal surface of the snout is paler than the dorsum, bearing diffuse creamy-white spots suffused with brown. The flanks are blackish-brown with a creamy-white to pale yellow oblique lateral stripe, with a faint suffusion of melanophores anteriorly. The loreal region and the tip of the snout are blackish-brown. The area beneath the tympanum, eye, and loreal region are creamy-white to pale yellow, delimited ventrally by a diffuse suffusion of black.

The venter is silvery-white, with the throat being faintly stippled spotting or reticulation at most. There is a wavy, creamy white to pale yellow ventrolateral stripe, differing from the silvery-white of the venter, diffuse along the ventral edge. The dorsal surface of the upper arm, near the insertion, is creamy-white to pale yellow. The axilla, groin, posteroventral thigh, and concealed shank are suffused with orange. The pale paracloacal marks are conspicuous creamy-white to inconspicuous pale brown. The ventral surfaces of the thighs, the ventral surface of the upper arm, and the concealed surface of the forearm is translucent creamy pink and unpigmented. The posteroventral surface of the proximal portion of the thighs has minuscule white spots that can vary in number from less than ten to more than 30. These spots are present in both sexes. The iris is pale gold with black speckles and a pale gold ring completely surrounding the pupil.

Leucostethus siapida is characterized by complete, pale, oblique and ventrolateral stripes; the absence of a dorsolateral stripe; a very weakly swollen finger IV in adult males; faintly stippled spotting or reticulation on the throat of adult males; the presence of pale paracloacal spots; an orange suffusion on the axilla, groin, and concealed surfaces of the hind limb; and basal webbing on toes II–IV.

== Distribution and ecology ==
Leucostethus siapida is currently known only from Gorgona Island in the Cauca Department of Colombia, but may also occur on the mainland. The frog is active during the day in and on leaf litter, low vegetation, and low objects, such as rocks and logs, on the forest floor. They can be found somewhat distant, over three meters, from a stream. Vocalizing has been observed while fully exposed on leaf litter and low objects on the forest floor. Specimens respond to playback both by responding vocally and moving towards the source of the playback. Individuals of the species have only been observed after around six hours of heavy rain in the morning.

== Conservation ==
Leucostethus siapida has not been assessed by the IUCN, but the authors of the study describing the species recommended that the species be considered vulnerable due to its small known distribution, restricted to a single island. Gorgona Island is protected as a National Natural Park.
