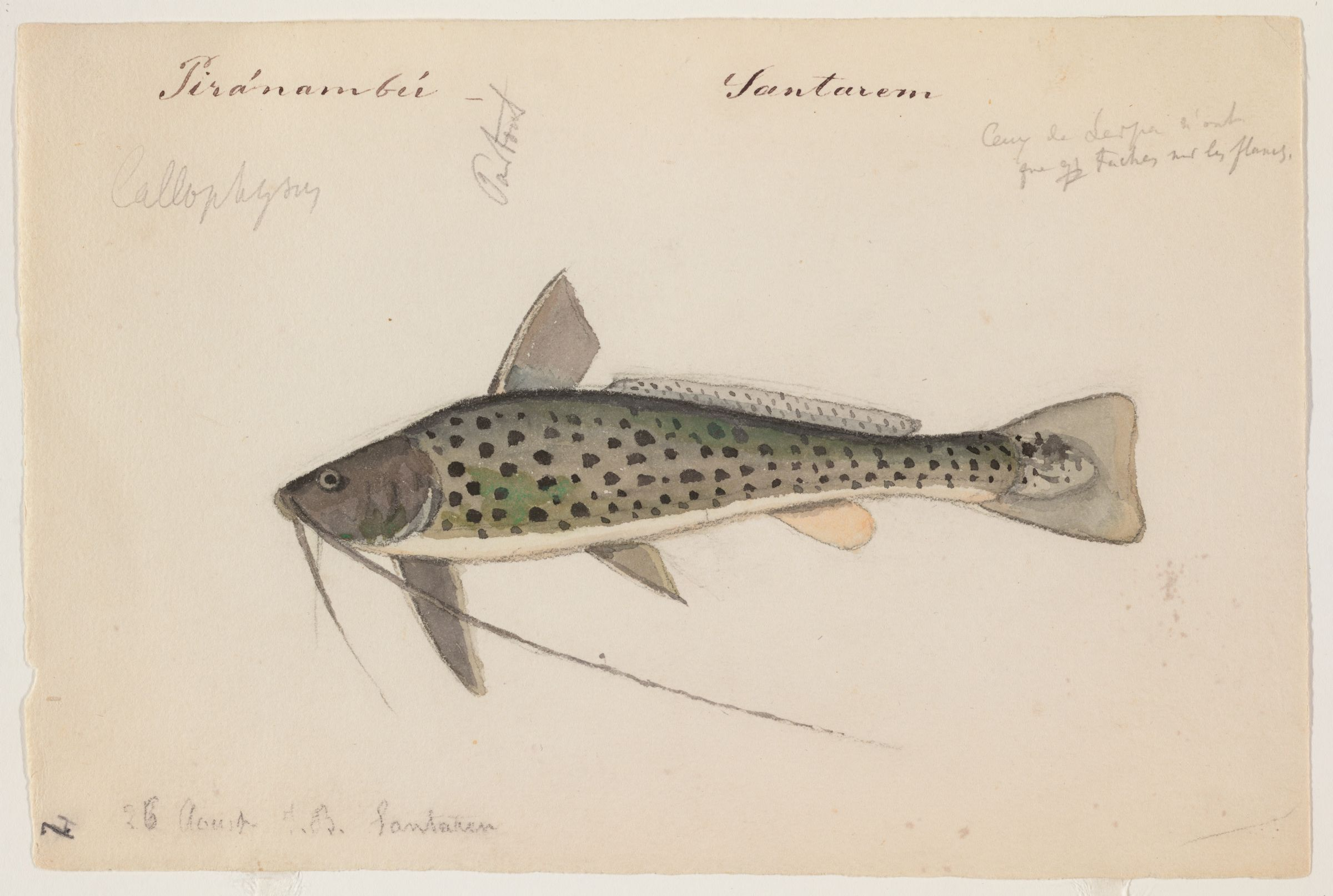
- Aguarunichthys torosus

Scientific classification
- Kingdom: Animalia
- Phylum: Chordata
- Class: Actinopterygii
- Order: Siluriformes
- Family: Pimelodidae
- Genus: Aguarunichthys; Stewart, 1986

Type species
- Aguarunichthys torosus Stewart 1986

= Aguarunichthys =

Genus of fishes

Aguarunichthys is a genus of long-whiskered catfishes native to South America.

== Species ==
There are currently three recognized species in this genus:

- Aguarunichthys inpai Zuanon, Rapp Py-Daniel & Jégu, 1993
- Aguarunichthys tocantinsensis Zuanon, Rapp Py-Daniel & Jégu, 1993
- Aguarunichthys torosus Stewart, 1986

== Etymology ==
Aguarunichthys is derived from Aguaruna, the name of a society of people from where A. torosus was collected, as well as ichthys, meaning fish. The species name of A. torosus is derived from the Latin brawny or muscular for its body form. A. tocantinsensis is named for the Tocantins River from which it was first collected. A. inpai is a latinization of the National Institute of Amazonian Research (INPA).

== Distribution and habitat ==
A. inpai inhabits the middle Amazon River basin in Brazil, A. tocantinsensis originates from the Tocantins River basin in Brazil, and A. torosus is known from the Cenepa River basin of the Amazon River drainage in Peru.

A. tocantinsensis has been found in areas with strong currents and rocky bottom. On the other hand, A. inpai inhabits areas where the riverbed consists of sediments. These fish species are rarely captured and are unknown to the local fishermen; this may be due to their deep-bottom dwelling habits.

== Description ==
Aguarunichthys was originally described due to the distinctive finger-like projections of the gas bladder. There are three pairs of barbels, one pair of long maxillary barbels and two pairs of shorter chin barbels.

A. inpai has small spots on a cream-coloured body, while the other two species have large darker spots on an olive-brown body. A. torosus appears more elongate (it has a longer distance between its dorsal fin and adipose fin) and has a smaller eye than A. tocantinsensis. These species reach about 30–40 centimetres (12–16 in) SL.
