= Rio Santiago =

Rio Santiago may refer to:

- Río Santiago (Puerto Rico), a river of Puerto Rico
- Río Santiago District, a district in Peru
- Río Santiago Shipyard in Buenos Aires, Argentina
- Río Grande de Santiago, a river in Mexico
