= Leucostethus argyrogaster =

Conservation status
- Least Concern (IUCN 3.1)

Scientific classification
- Kingdom: Animalia
- Phylum: Chordata
- Class: Amphibia
- Order: Anura
- Family: Dendrobatidae
- Genus: Leucostethus
- Species: L. argyrogaster

Binomial name
- Leucostethus argyrogaster (Morales & Schulte, 1993)

Synonyms
- Colostethus argyrogaster Morales & Schulte, 1993

Species of frog

Leucostethus argyrogaster or the Imaza rocket frog is a species of frog in the family Dendrobatidae. It is endemic to Peru.

== Description ==
The adult male frog measures about 19.8 mm in snout-vent length and the adult female frog about 22.1 mm. The frog has large disks on the toes of all four feet. The skin of the dorsum is light brown in color. The skin of the flanks is dark brown in color. There are silver stripes and white stripes down both sides of the body. The upper surfaces of the hind legs are cream-white in color. There is orange coloration on the inner parts of the hind legs. There is a white mark near the vent. The throat and chest are cream-white in color. The belly is silver in color. The iris of the eye is bronze in color. The male frog's testes are white in color.

== Habitat ==
This diurnal, terrestrial frog lives in lowlands and submontane habitats. Scientists have observed it near streams in both primary and secondary forest between 400 and 1700 meters above sea level.

This frog's range includes some protected areas, for example Santiago-Comaina Reserved Zone and the Alto Mayo protected area.

== Reproduction ==
The female frog lays eggs on the leaf litter. After the eggs hatch, the female frog carries the tadpoles to streams.

== Threats ==
The IUCN classifies this frog as least concern of extinction. What threat it faces comes from conversion of the forests where it lives to farmland.
