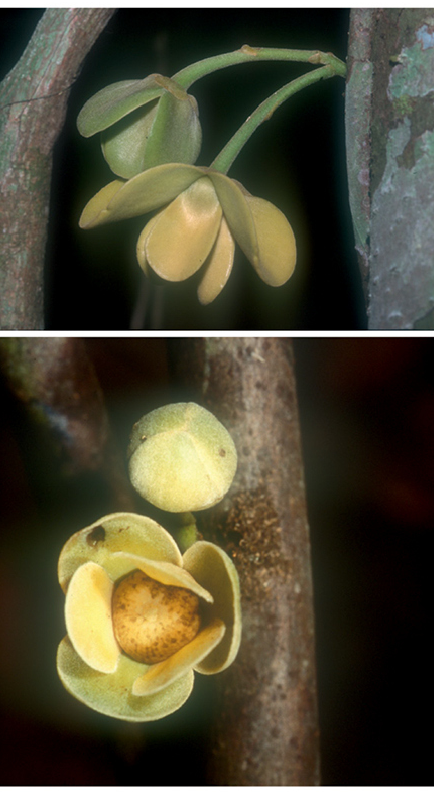
- Photograph of Cremastosperma cauliflorum

Conservation status
- Least Concern (IUCN 3.1)

Scientific classification
- Kingdom: Plantae
- Clade: Embryophytes
- Clade: Tracheophytes
- Clade: Spermatophytes
- Clade: Angiosperms
- Clade: Magnoliids
- Order: Magnoliales
- Family: Annonaceae
- Genus: Cremastosperma
- Species: C. cauliflorum

Binomial name
- Cremastosperma cauliflorum R.E.Fr.

= Cremastosperma cauliflorum =

Species of plant

Cremastosperma cauliflorum is a species of plant in the family Annonaceae. It is native to Brazil, Colombia, Ecuador and Peru. Robert Elias Fries, the Swedish botanist who first formally described the species, named it after its flowers which grow from its main trunk or stem (caulis in Latin).

== Description ==
It is a tree reaching 20 meters in height. Its wood has a scent like vanilla. Its oval to elliptical, paper leaves are 20–61 by 5–14 centimeters and hairless except for sparse hairs on the midrib. The leaves are olive green on their upper surface and darker green underneath. The leaves have blunt or pointed bases and tips that come to a tapering point. The leaves have 10–17 secondary veins emanating from their midribs at 45°-70° angles. Its petioles are 4–12 by 2–4 millimeters. Its branching inflorescences have 1–5 flowers on 3–12 by 1–1.5 millimeter peduncles that grow on thick twigs or directly from the main trunk. The flowers are attached to the peduncle by 10–45 by 1–3 millimeter pedicels. Both the peduncles and pedicels are densely covered in gold colored hairs. The pedicels are subtended by a triangular, 1.5–2 millimeter long bract that is covered in dense gold colored hairs. The pedicels have a second oval to triangular bract at their midpoint that is 2–4 millimeters long and covered in dense gold colored hairs. Its flowers range from green to white to yellow. Its flowers have 3 oval to triangular sepals that are 3–5 by 4–6 millimeters with tips that curve back. The outer surfaces of the sepals are covered in dense gold colored hairs, while the inner surfaces are hairless or only sparsely hairy. Its flowers have 6 petals in two rows of three. The outer, elliptical petals are 10–25 by 9–17 millimeters. The inner elliptical petals are 11–21 by 6–11 millimeters. The outer surfaces of the petals are covered in dense gold colored hairs, while the inner surfaces are hairless or only sparsely hairy. Its numerous, spirally-arranged stamens are 1.5–2 millimeters long. Its flowers have about 40 carpels that are 2–2.3 millimeters long and variably covered in gold colored hairs. Its mature fruit are round to ellipsoid, 8–13 by 10–14 millimeters, and variable colored orange, red, brown or black. The fruit have 9–10 round to ellipsoid, orange, pitted seeds that are 9–10 by 9–10 millimeters.

=== Habitat and distribution ===
It has been observed growing in forest habitats, with clay or sand soils, at 100–500 meter elevations.

=== Reproductive biology ===
The pollen of C. cauliflorum is shed as solitary grains with some permanent tetrads.

=== Uses ===
It is used as a traditional medicine by the Achuar of Ecuador to treat gastrointestinal ailments.
