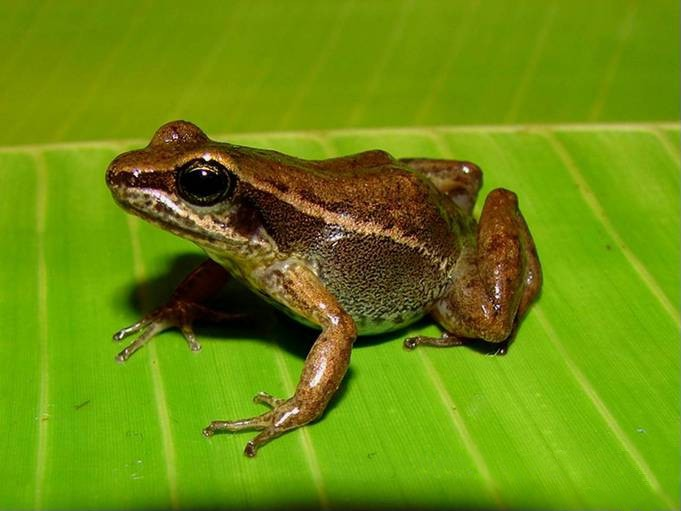
- Leucostethus fraterdanieli
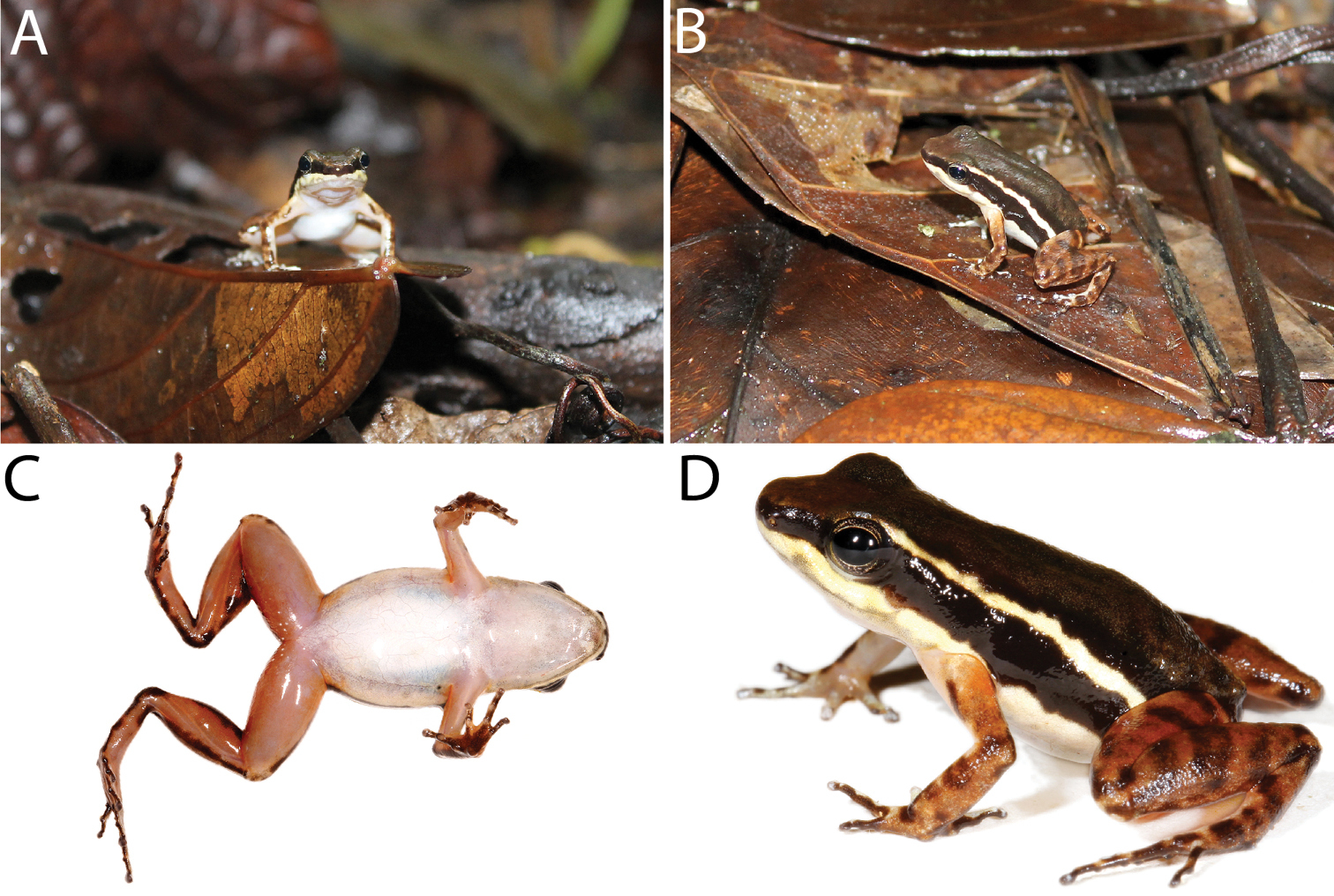
- holotype specimen of Leucostethus siapida

Scientific classification
- Kingdom: Animalia
- Phylum: Chordata
- Class: Amphibia
- Order: Anura
- Family: Dendrobatidae
- Subfamily: Colostethinae
- Genus: Leucostethus; Grant, Rada et al., 2017

Type species
- Leucostethus argyrogaster Morales & Schulte, 1993

= Leucostethus =

Genus of amphibians

Leucostethus is a genus of frogs in the family Dendrobatidae, in the subfamily Colostethinae. The frogs are found in the western Amazon rainforest.

The members of this genus are unique among the Colostethinae in that both males and females lack dark colouration on the ventral part of their bodies. The genus is named combining the Greek words leukos ('white') and stethos ('chest').

The following species are recognised in the genus Leucostethus:

- Leucostethus alacris (Rivero and Granados-Díaz, 1990)
- Leucostethus argyrogaster (Morales and Schulte, 1993)
- Leucostethus bilsa Vigle et al., 2020
- Leucostethus brachistriatus (Rivero and Serna, 1986)
- Leucostethus dysprosium (Rivero and Serna, 2000)
- Leucostethus fraterdanieli (Silverstone, 1971)
- Leucostethus fugax (Morales and Schulte, 1993)
- Leucostethus jota Marín-Castaño et al., 2018
- Leucostethus ramirezi (Rivero and Serna, 2000)
- Leucostethus siapida Grant and Bolívar-García, 2021
- Leucostethus yaguara (Rivero and Serna, 1991)
