= Leucostethus alacris =

Conservation status
- Data Deficient (IUCN 3.1)

Scientific classification
- Kingdom: Animalia
- Phylum: Chordata
- Class: Amphibia
- Order: Anura
- Family: Dendrobatidae
- Genus: Leucostethus
- Species: L. alacris

Binomial name
- Leucostethus alacris (Rivero & Granados-Diaz, 1990)

Synonyms
- Colostethus alacris Rivero and Granados-Díaz, 1990

Species of frog

Leucostethus alacris or the Finca Primavera rocket frog is a species of frog in the family Dendrobatidae. It is endemic to Colombia.

== Home ==
This frog has been observed in the Cordillera Occidental portion of the Andes Mountains, about 1400 meters above sea level. They were found on the ground near streams in forests. None were observed outside forest habitats.

This frog's range includes the protected area Parque Nacional Natural Munchique.

== Reproduction ==
Scientists did not directly observe any female frogs laying eggs or any tadpoles, but they infer that this frog reproduces in the same manner as other rocket frogs: the female lays eggs on the ground, and, after the eggs hatch, the adults carry the tadpoles to water.

== Threats ==
The IUCN classifies this frog as data deficient. It's precise threats are not known. However, scientists note ongoing habitat loss associated with logging, livestock cultivation, and illegal agriculture.
