= Santa María de Nieva =

- Town
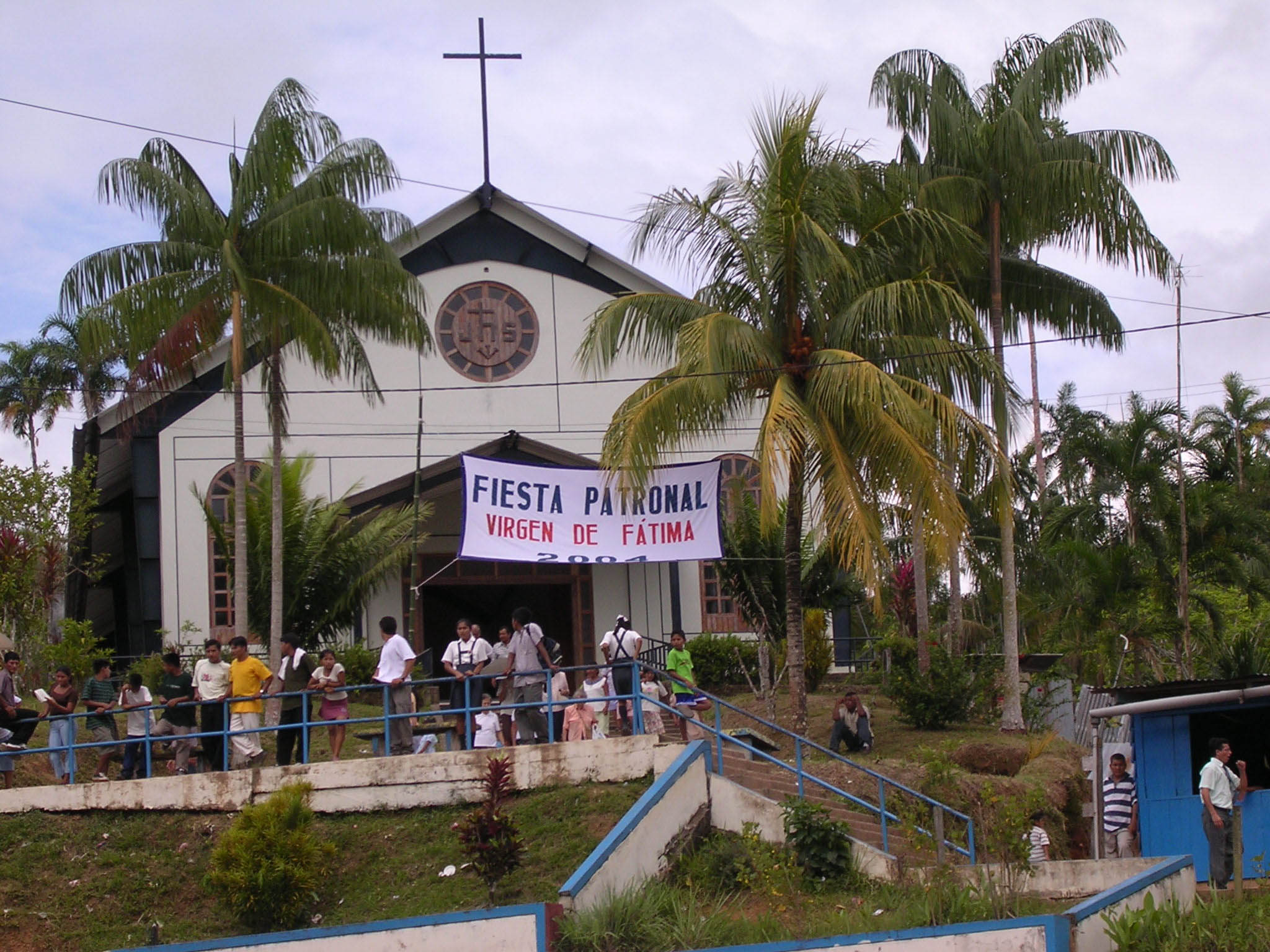

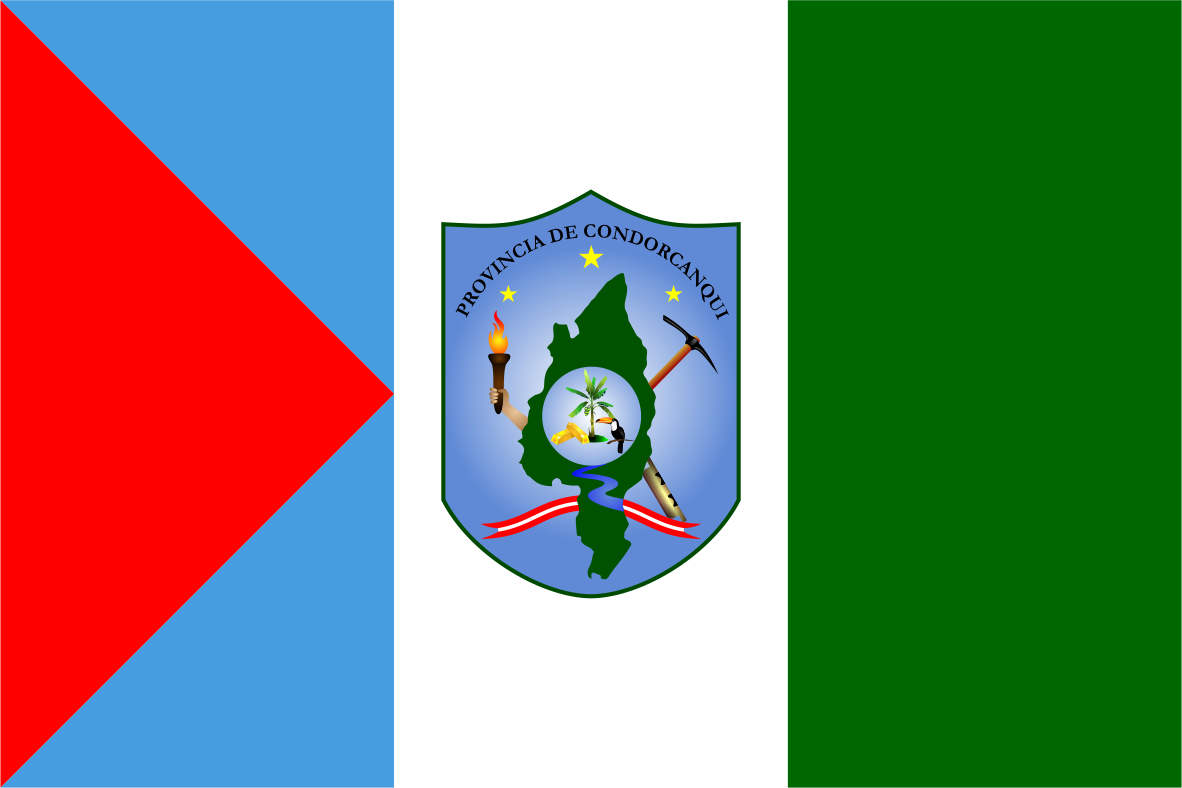
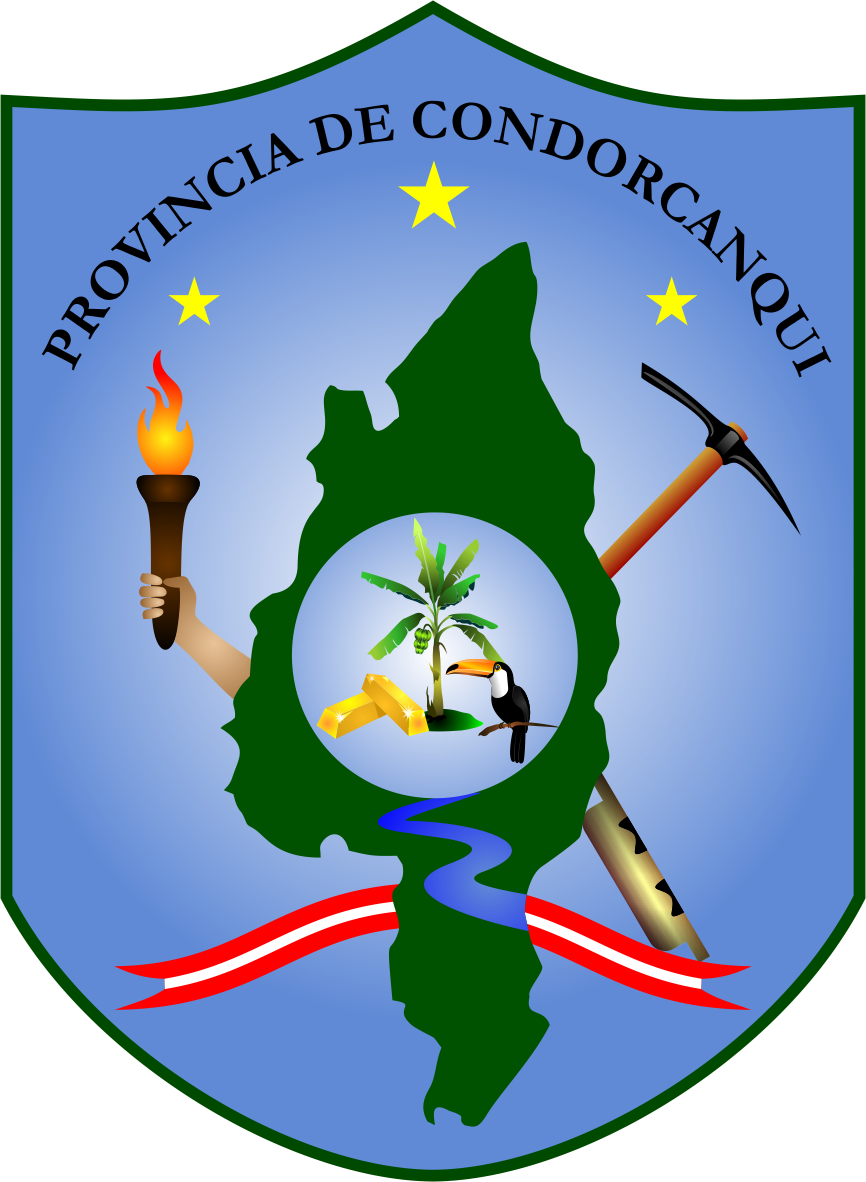
- Flag Seal

- Location within Peru
- Coordinates: 4°35′00″S 77°59′00″W
- Country: Peru
- Region: Amazonas
- Province: Condorcanqui
- District: Nieva

The town of Santa Maria de Nieva, is a capital of the province of Condorcanqui in the department of Amazonas Region, in Peru. It was constituted as such in 1984. It is located on the banks of the Marañón River and the Nieva River, geographically is located in Amazon region, with a tropical, warm and rainy climate.
