= Shamatak =

Human settlement in Peru

Coordinates: 4.5790°S 78.4793°W

The locality of Shamatak Grande is in the El Cenepa District in the department of Amazonas, Peru.
