= El Cenepa District =

Coordinates: 4°04′59″S 78°18′00″W

El Cenepa
- District
- Interactive map of El Cenepa
- Country: Peru
- Region: Amazonas
- Province: Condorcanqui
- Founded: September 1, 1941
- Capital: Huampami

Government
  - Mayor: Manuel Diaz Nashap

Area
  - Total: 5,345.48 km^{2} (2,063.90 sq mi)
- Elevation: 220 m (720 ft)

Population (2005 census)
  - Total: 11,236
  - Density: 2.1020/km^{2} (5.4441/sq mi)
- Time zone: UTC-5 (PET)
- UBIGEO: 010402

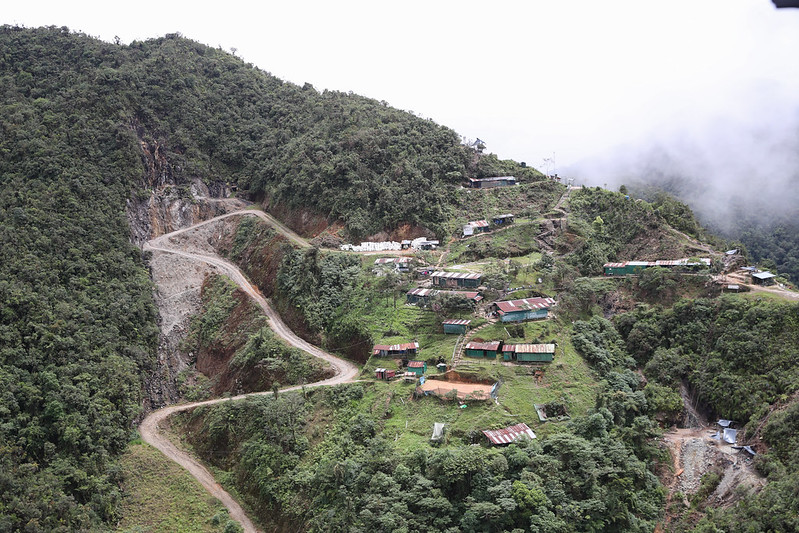
Military base in El Cenepa

El Cenepa is a district of the province of Condorcanqui in Peru. The district of El Cenepa, created on September 1, 1941 by Law Nº 9364, belongs to the province of Condorcanqui, department of Amazonas. It has an area of 5,558 km^{2}, which represents 24% of the territory of Alto Marañón. El Cenepa has 8,363 inhabitants, and a population density of 1.5 inhabitants/km^{2}.

== Localities ==
Localities within the district include:

- Shamatak
