= Condorcanqui province =

Coordinates: 4°34′59″S 77°54′00″W

Condorcanqui
- Province
- Flag Coat of arms

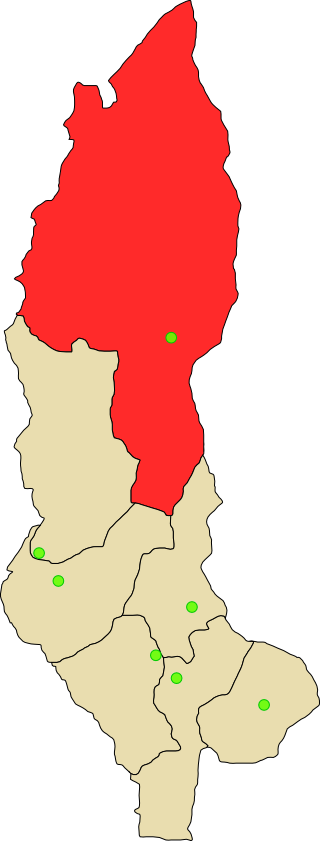
- Location of Condorcanqui in the Amazonas Region
- Country: Peru
- Region: Amazonas
- Capital: Santa María de Nieva

Government
  - Mayor: Hector Orlando Requejo Longinote

Area
  - Total: 17,865.39 km^{2} (6,897.87 sq mi)

Population
  - Total: 46,925
  - Density: 2.6266/km^{2} (6.8028/sq mi)
- UBIGEO: 0104
- Website: www.gob.pe/municondorcanqui

Condorcanqui is a province of the Amazonas Region, Peru. It was created by law 23832 of May 18, 1984, based on territories of the province of Bagua, covering the basins of the rivers Santiago, Cenepa and Marañon. The province was named in honor to Tupac Amaru II

Its principal route is the fluvial one, it lasts three days of navigation to come to Santa Maria de Nieva, capital of the province, furrowing the waters of the Marañón river.

== Political division ==
Condorcanqui is divided into three districts, which are:

District	Mayor
El Cenepa	Manuel Diaz Nashap
Nieva	Hector Orlando Requejo Longinote
Río Santiago	Segundo Flores Nahuarosa

== Places of interest ==
- Ichigkat muja - Cordillera del Condor National Park
- Santiago-Comaina Reserved Zone

== See also ==
- Nieva River
