= Leucostethus yaguara =

Conservation status
- Data Deficient (IUCN 3.1)

Scientific classification
- Kingdom: Animalia
- Phylum: Chordata
- Class: Amphibia
- Order: Anura
- Family: Dendrobatidae
- Genus: Leucostethus
- Species: L. yaguara

Binomial name
- Leucostethus yaguara Rivero & Serna, 1991

Synonyms
- Colostethus yaguara Rivero and Serna, 1991

Species of frog

Leucostethus yaguara is a species of frog in the family Dendrobatidae. It is endemic to Colombia where it is only known from its type locality, Ituango, on the Cordillera Occidental in the northern Antioquia Department. It might be conspecific with Colostethus fraterdanieli. Scientists observed the frog in the leaf litter near streams in cloud forest habitat are approximately 1475 meters above sea level.

Scientists did not directly observe any egg deposition or tadpoles, but they infer that the young develop in streams, like other species in Leucostethus.

The IUCN classifies this frog as data deficient. It has not been re-observed in any subsequent surveys. It's specific threats are not known, but there is ongoing habitat loss in the area as humans convert forests to farmland and grazing space.
