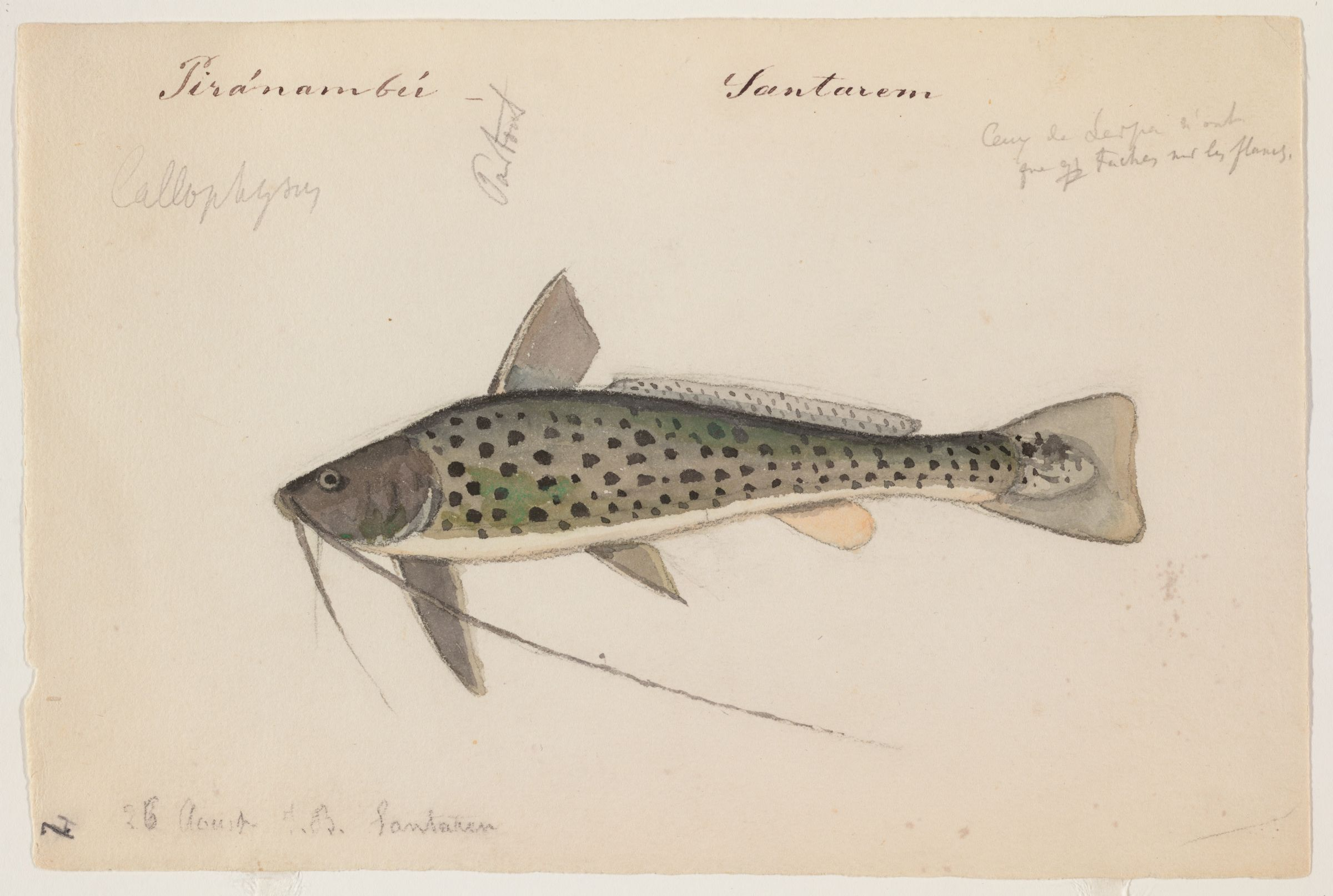
- Jacques Burkhardt, 1865
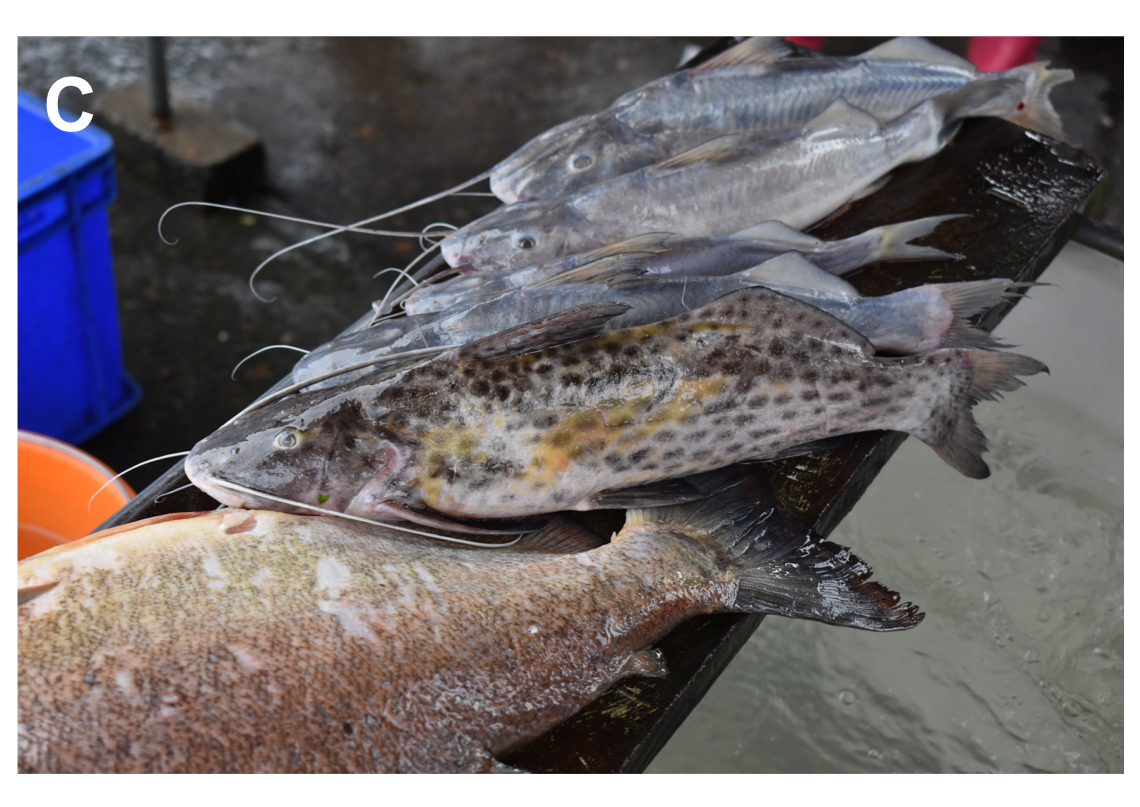
- Yasuní National Park

Scientific classification
- Kingdom: Animalia
- Phylum: Chordata
- Class: Actinopterygii
- Order: Siluriformes
- Family: Pimelodidae
- Genus: Aguarunichthys
- Species: A. torosus

Binomial name
- Aguarunichthys torosus Stewart, 1986

= Aguarunichthys torosus =

Species of fish

Aguarunichthys torosus, the bolt catfish or yellow-band catfish, locally piranambu, is a species of benthopelagic catfish of the family Pimelodidae that is native to Cenepa River basin in Amazon River drainage of Peru.

This species is only found in Río Marañón in the upper Amazon basin of Peru. It grows to a length of 346 millimetres (13.6 in).
