= Leucostethus ramirezi =

Conservation status
- Endangered (IUCN 3.1)

Scientific classification
- Kingdom: Animalia
- Phylum: Chordata
- Class: Amphibia
- Order: Anura
- Family: Dendrobatidae
- Genus: Leucostethus
- Species: L. ramirezi

Binomial name
- Leucostethus ramirezi (Rivero & Serna, 2000)

Synonyms
- Colostethus ramirezi Rivero and Serna, 2000 "1995"

Species of frog

Leucostethus ramirezi is a species of frog in the family Dendrobatidae that is endemic to Colombia. It is only known from the region of its type locality, Urrao in the Antioquia Department.

== Habitat ==
Scientists observed this frog on farms and in pastures near forests and unpolluted streams between 1,300 and 2,160 metres (4,270 and 7,090 ft) above sea level.

The frog's known range includes one protected park: Parque Nacional Natural Las Orquídeas. Scientists believe it may also live in Parque Nacional Natural Paramillo.

== Young ==
Scientists have observed tadpoles swimming in small pools of water, even footprints.

== Threats ==
The IUCN classifies this species as endangered. They observe that it can live in habitats that have faced some disturbance but do not think it can tolerate extremely disturbed habitats. The frog faces threats from deforestation in favor of agriculture, livestock cultivation, and illegal gold mining. The deforestation affects parts of the Parque Nacional Natural Las Orquídeas.

Scientists do not know whether the fungal disease chytridiomycosis is affecting this population or not.
