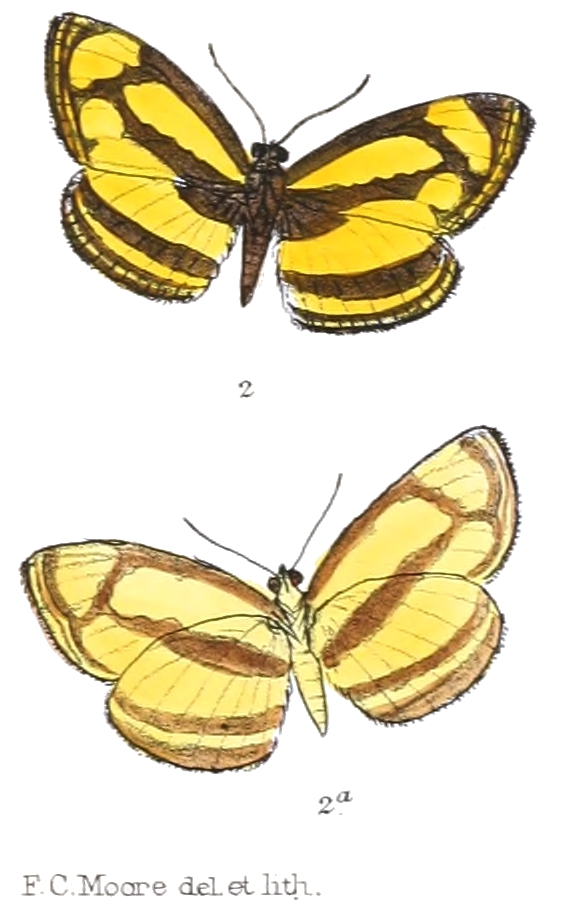
- Lasippa tiga camboja

Scientific classification
- Domain: Eukaryota
- Kingdom: Animalia
- Phylum: Arthropoda
- Class: Insecta
- Order: Lepidoptera
- Family: Nymphalidae
- Genus: Lasippa
- Species: L. tiga

Binomial name
- Lasippa tiga (Moore, 1858)

= Lasippa tiga =

Species of butterfly

Lasippa tiga, the Malayan lascar, is an Indomalayan butterfly of the family Nymphalidae. It was first described by Frederic Moore in 1858. The larva feeds on Cratoxylon species (shrubs or small to medium-sized trees).

== Subspecies ==
- Lasippa tiga tiga Java
- Lasippa tiga camboja (Moore, 1879) Assam to Thailand, Langkawi
- Lasippa tiga siaka (Moore, 1881) Peninsular Malaya, Sumatra
- Lasippa tiga niasana (Fruhstorfer, 1900) Nias
- Lasippa tiga siberuta (Corbet, 1942) Mentawai
