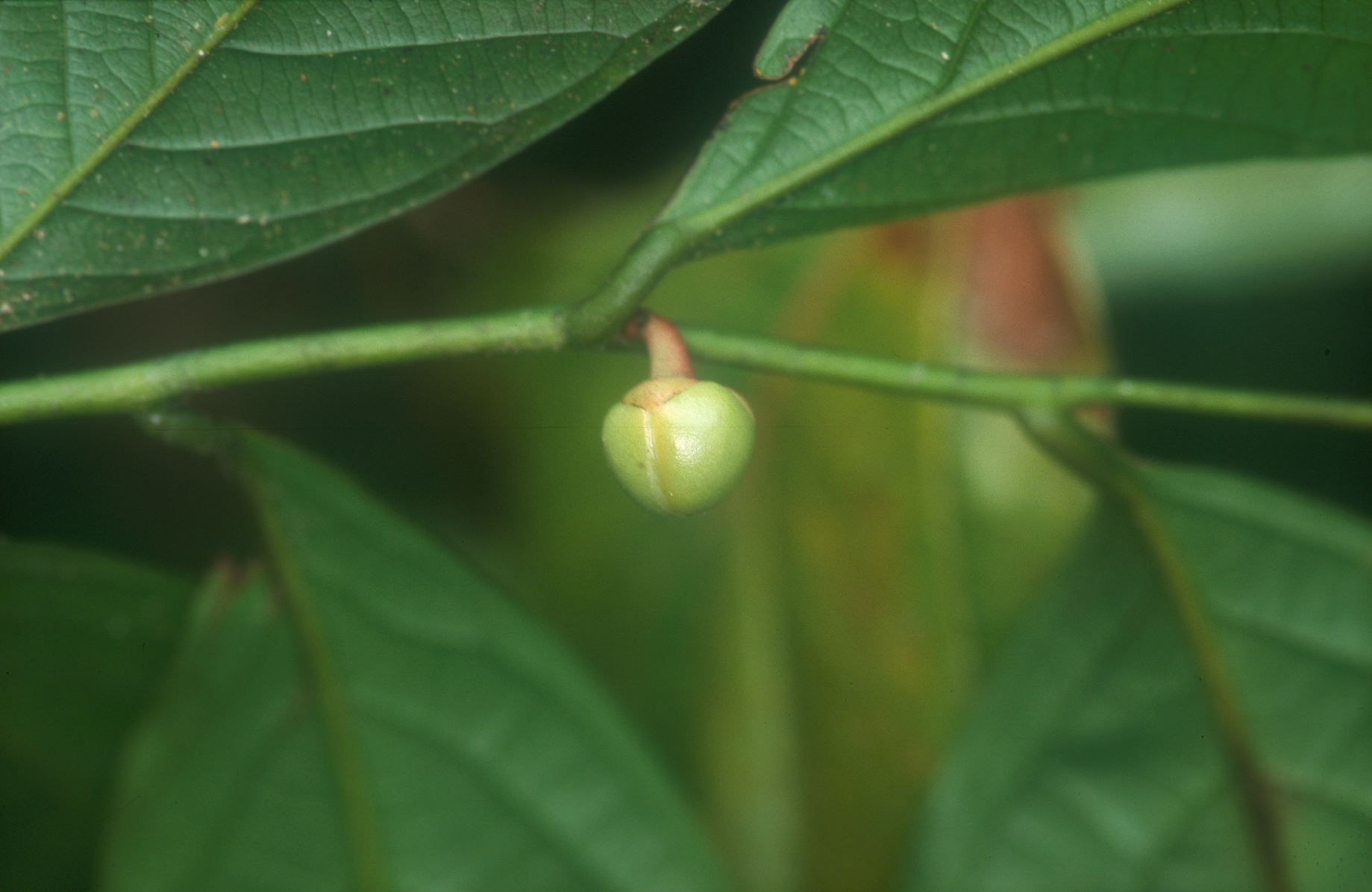
- Flowering branch of Cremastosperma yamayakatense, from Amazonas, Peru

Scientific classification
- Kingdom: Plantae
- Clade: Embryophytes
- Clade: Tracheophytes
- Clade: Spermatophytes
- Clade: Angiosperms
- Clade: Magnoliids
- Order: Magnoliales
- Family: Annonaceae
- Genus: Cremastosperma; R.E.Fr.

= Cremastosperma =

Genus of flowering plants

Cremastosperma is a genus of flowering plants in the family Annonaceae, subfamily Malmeoideae, tribe Malmeae. In 2018 there were 34 recognised species distributed in Central and South America.

Cremastosperma was described by Robert Elias Fries in 1930, based on Aberemoa pedunculata Diels, originally described by Ludwig Diels (1906), which thus became the type species Cremastosperma pedunculatum (Diels) R.E.Fr..

Species of Cremastosperma are found in lowland to pre-montane tropical forest in the Neotropics. The greatest species diversity is distributed in the narrow tropical zone to the west of the Andean mountain chain on the Pacific Ocean side of north-western South America, north into Central America as far as Costa Rica; and on the eastern side of the Andes extending from Colombia through eastern Ecuador and Peru as far south as Bolivia. Two species are found in coastal Venezuela (Cremastosperma macrocarpum Maas and Cremastosperma venezuelanum Pirie), and one in French Guiana (Cremastosperma brevipes (DC.) R.E.Fr.).

== Description ==
Cremastosperma species are small understory trees with typical Annonaceae floral morphology (sepals and petals in whorls of three; indefinite numbers of spirally arranged stamens and carpels) bearing a resemblance to various other Neotropical genera with apocarpous, single-seeded, stipitate fruits (such as Guatteria). The most useful character by which they can be distinguished from these and other similar Neotropical Annonaceae is displayed by the midrib of the leaves, which is raised on the upper side with an unusual, mostly conspicuous, longitudinal groove.

As of January 2025, Plants of the World Online accepts the following 34 species:

- Cremastosperma alticola Pirie & Chatrou
- Cremastosperma antioquense Pirie
- Cremastosperma awaense Pirie
- Cremastosperma brachypodum Pirie & Chatrou
- Cremastosperma brevipes (DC. ex Dunal) R.E.Fr.
- Cremastosperma bullatum Pirie
- Cremastosperma cauliflorum R.E.Fr.
- Cremastosperma cenepense Pirie & Zapata
- Cremastosperma chococola Pirie
- Cremastosperma confusum Pirie
- Cremastosperma dolichocarpum Pirie
- Cremastosperma dolichopodum Pirie & Maas
- Cremastosperma gracilipes R.E.Fr.
- Cremastosperma leiophyllum R.E.Fr.
- Cremastosperma longicuspe R.E.Fr.
- Cremastosperma longipes Pirie
- Cremastosperma macrocarpum Maas
- Cremastosperma magdalenae Pirie
- Cremastosperma megalophyllum R.E.Fr.
- Cremastosperma microcarpum R.E.Fr.
- Cremastosperma monospermum (Rusby) R.E.Fr.
- Cremastosperma napoense Pirie
- Cremastosperma novogranatense R.E.Fr.
- Cremastosperma oblongum R.E.Fr.
- Cremastosperma osicola Pirie & Chatrou
- Cremastosperma pacificum R.E.Fr.
- Cremastosperma panamense Maas
- Cremastosperma pedunculatum (Diels) R.E.Fr.
- Cremastosperma pendulum (Ruiz & Pav.) R.E.Fr.
- Cremastosperma peruvianum R.E.Fr.
- Cremastosperma stenophyllum Pirie
- Cremastosperma venezuelanum Pirie
- Cremastosperma westrae Pirie
- Cremastosperma yamayakatense Pirie
