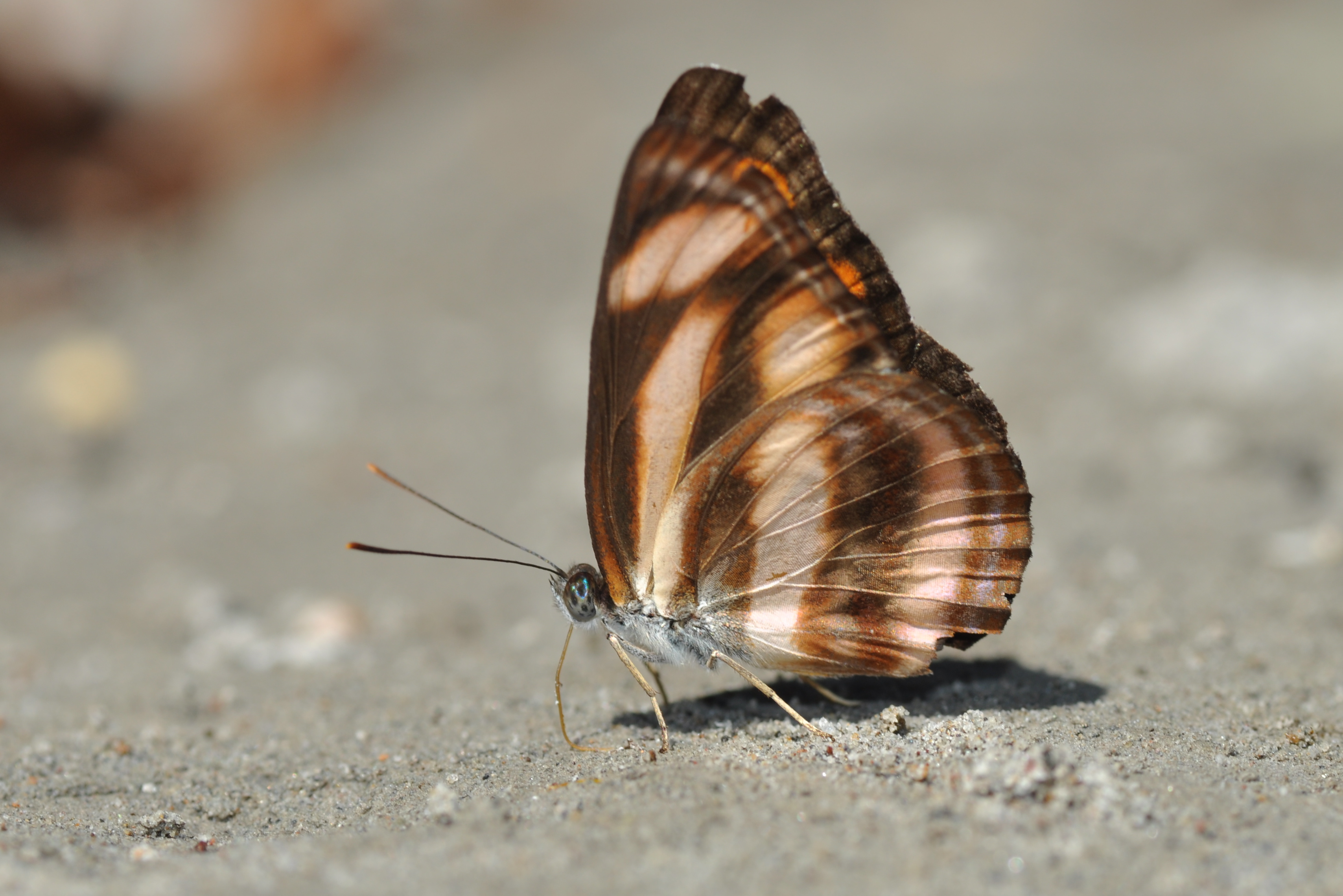
- Ventral View
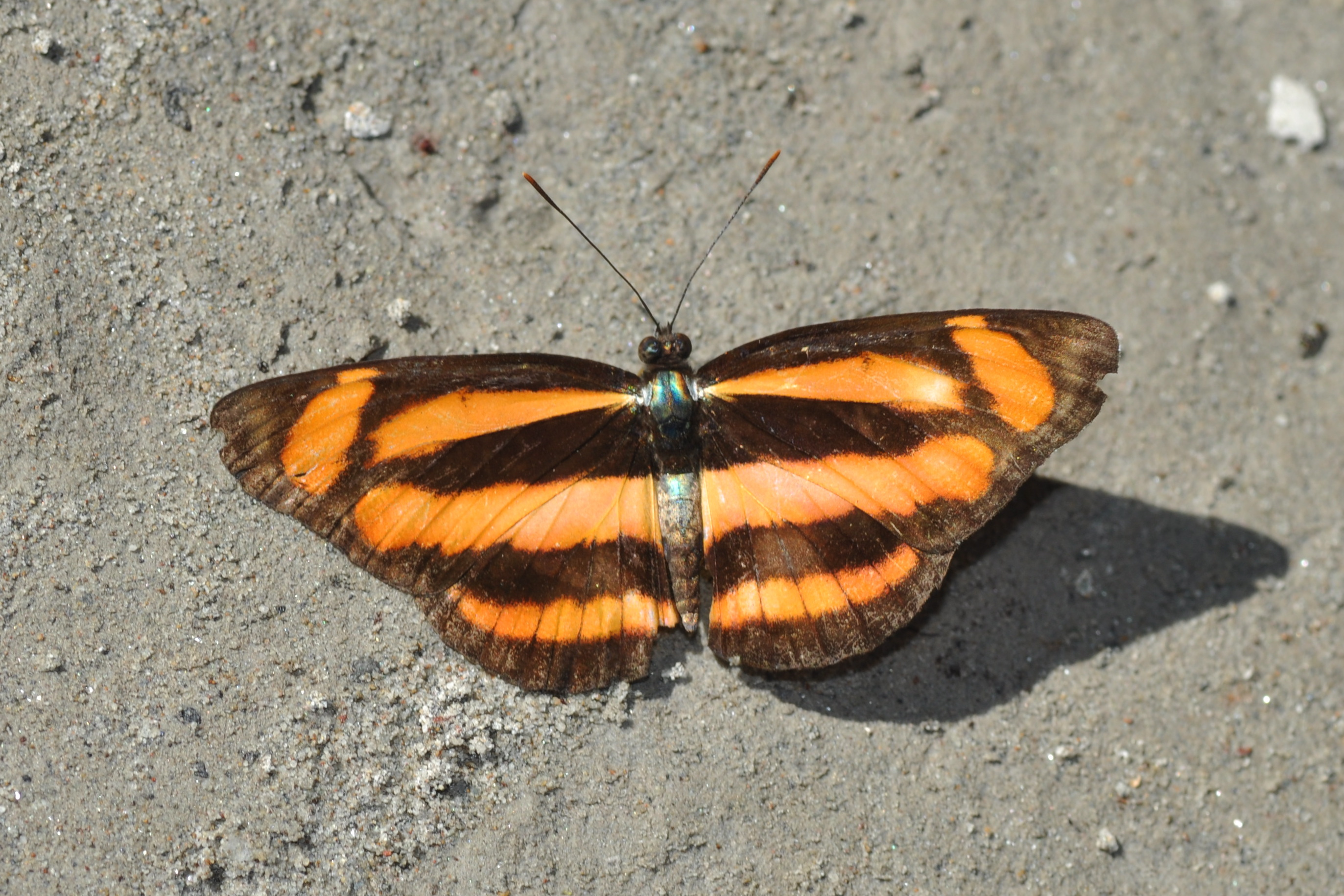
- Dorsal View

Scientific classification
- Domain: Eukaryota
- Kingdom: Animalia
- Phylum: Arthropoda
- Class: Insecta
- Order: Lepidoptera
- Family: Nymphalidae
- Genus: Lasippa
- Species: L. viraja

Binomial name
- Lasippa viraja (Moore, 1872)

Synonyms
- Neptis viraja

= Lasippa viraja =

Yellowjack sailer

Species of butterfly

Lasippa viraja, the yellowjack sailer, is a species of nymphalid butterfly found in South Asia.

== Subspecies ==
The subspecies of Lasippa viraja are:

- Lasippa viraja viraja Moore, 1872 – northeast India, Nepal, Myanmar
- Lasippa viraja kanara Evans, 1924 – south India
- Lasippa viraja nar de Nicéville, 1891 – Andamans

== Description ==
Males and females upperside black; markings orange yellow. Forewing: discoidal streak very broad and long, descending a little below vein 4; a short broad band sloping obliquely outwards from middle of dorsum to beyond vein 3, another short broad and somewhat clavate (club-shaped) band sloping obliquely outwards from apical third of costa to below vein 5; beyond these, a subterminal slender line. Hindwing: a subbasal, transverse, very broad, somewhat paler yellow band; a postdiscal slightly narrower transverse band, not quite reaching the costa, anteriorly attenuate, curved slightly inwards; a very faint and ill-defined pale subterminal line. Underside dusky brownish black, the markings as on the upperside but much blurred. Forewing with two subterminal slender lines, the outer not clearly defined. Hindwing: the costa at base yellowish; discal and subterminal pale narrow bands. Antennae, head, thorax and abdomen black; beneath, the palpi, thorax and abdomen greyish white, the abdomen slightly ochraceous. There is very little difference between the sexes, or between the wet- and dry-seasonal broods; the latter are on the whole paler both in ground colour and markings.

Wingspan 56–68 mm.

== Distribution ==
Sikkim; Bhutan; Bengal; Orissa; southern India; Assam; Burma and Tenasserim; Thailand; Laos.

== Larva ==
"Feeds on the blackwood tree (Dalbergia latifolia) and also on Dalbergia racemosa and has similar habits to those of N. hordonia, Stoll, which it resembles in form, but the head is bifid at the top, and the dorsal points are wanting, while the last-segment is produced into a single blunt point. The colour is dark greenish brown, the fore part, as in N. hordonia, being much darker than the rest, but bordered with pale grey." (Davidson, Bell & Aitken)

This form, as recorded by Mr. Bell, feeds, like N. hordonia, on decayed (not fresh) leaves.

== Pupa ==
"Like that of N. hordonia but rather broader and the wings more evenly expanded." (Davidson, Bell & Aitken.)
