= Leucostethus jota =

Scientific classification
- Kingdom: Animalia
- Phylum: Chordata
- Class: Amphibia
- Order: Anura
- Family: Dendrobatidae
- Genus: Leucostethus
- Species: L. jota

Binomial name
- Leucostethus jota (Marín, Molina-Zuluaga, Restrepo, Cano & Daza, 2018)

Species of frog

Leucostethus jota is a species of frog in the family Leucostethus. It is endemic to the municipalities of Alexandria, Amalfi, Granada, San Carlos, San Rafael and San Roque in the Department of Antioquia, Colombia. It inhabits premontane humid forests at 1158 to 1514 meters above sea level. Adult males have a snout-cloaca range of 16.1 to 21.6 mm. Adult females have a snout-cloaca range of 17.9 to 23.3 mm. This frog has straight, pale ventrolateral stripes. The male frog's testes are white in color.
