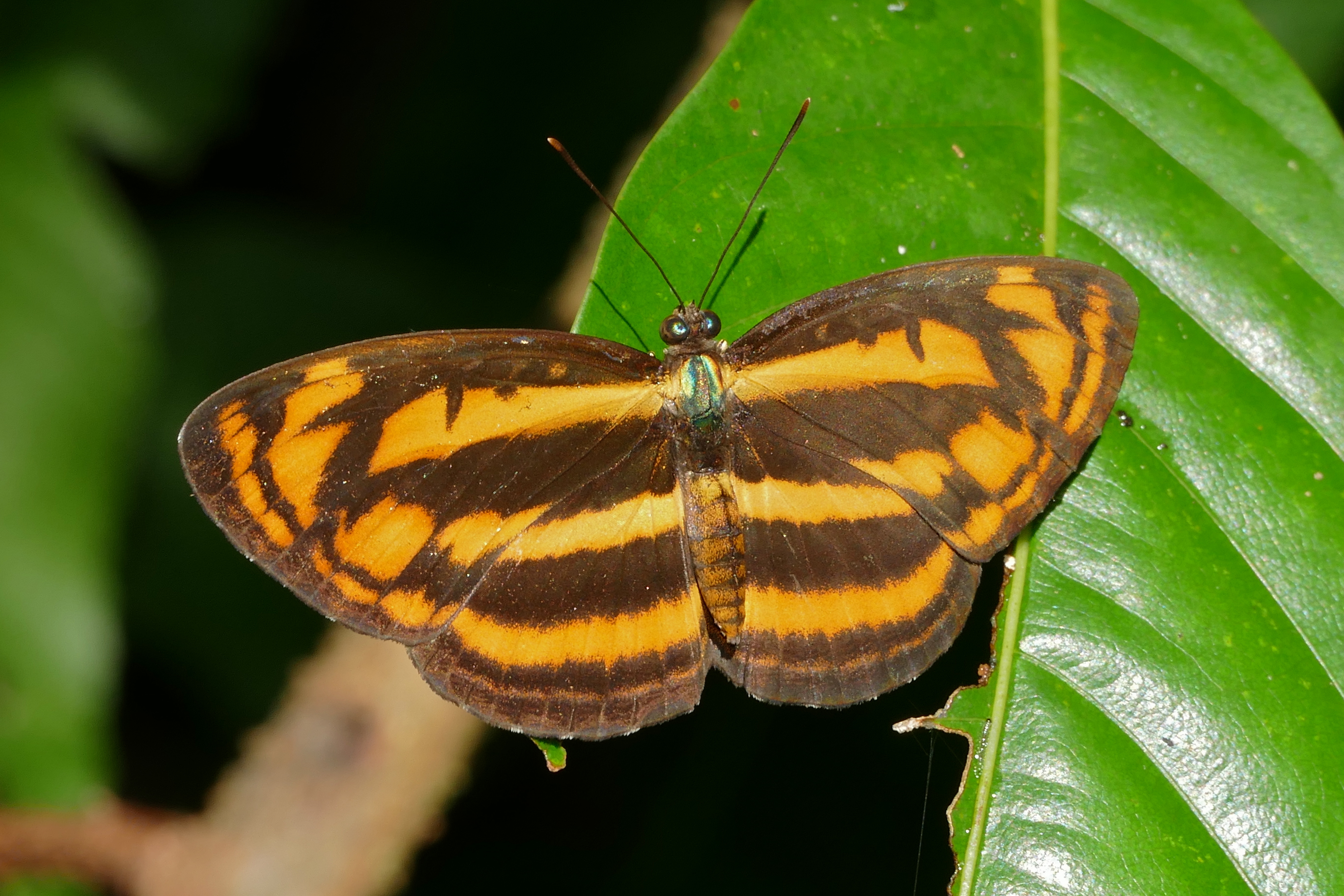
- Lasippa heliodore dorelia

Scientific classification
- Kingdom: Animalia
- Phylum: Arthropoda
- Clade: Pancrustacea
- Class: Insecta
- Order: Lepidoptera
- Family: Nymphalidae
- Genus: Lasippa
- Species: L. heliodore

Binomial name
- Lasippa heliodore (Fabricius, 1787)

= Lasippa heliodore =

Species of butterfly

Lassipa heliodore, the Burmese lascar, is an Indomalayan butterfly of the family Nymphalidae first described by Johan Christian Fabricius in 1787.

== Subspecies ==
- Lasippa heliodore heliodore Assam, Burma, Peninsular Thailand
- Lasippa heliodore dorelia (Butler, 1879) Peninsular Malaya, Sumatra, Borneo, Pulo Laut
- Lasippa heliodore roepkei (Eliot, 1959) Java
