= Aguarunichthys tocantinsensis =

Scientific classification
- Kingdom: Animalia
- Phylum: Chordata
- Class: Actinopterygii
- Order: Siluriformes
- Family: Pimelodidae
- Genus: Aguarunichthys
- Species: A. tocantinsensis

Binomial name
- Aguarunichthys tocantinsensis Zuanon, Rapp Py-Daniel & Jégu, 1993

Species of fish

The Tocantins pimelodus (Aguarunichthys tocantinsensis) is a species of benthopelagic catfish of the family Pimelodidae that is endemic to Brazil.

It grows to a maximum standard length of 31.7 cm (12.5 in). It inhabits fresh waters with strong currents and rocky bottom of Tucurui dam, in the Tocantins River.
