= Hyloxalus cevallosi =

Conservation status
- Endangered (IUCN 3.1)

Scientific classification
- Kingdom: Animalia
- Phylum: Chordata
- Class: Amphibia
- Order: Anura
- Family: Dendrobatidae
- Genus: Hyloxalus
- Species: H. cevallosi

Binomial name
- Hyloxalus cevallosi (Rivero, 1991)

Synonyms
- Colostethus cevallosi Rivero, 1991

Species of amphibian

Hyloxalus cevallosi, also known as Palanda rocket frog, is a species of poison dart frogs in the family Dendrobatidae. It is named after Gabriel Cevallos García, a famous Ecuadorean writer. This species of frog occurs on the east side of the Andes in Ecuador in the Pastaza Province. Its natural habitats are very humid premontane and pluvial premontane forests.

== Description ==
Hyloxalus cevallosi is a small ground-dwelling species of frog that is easily overlooked. It is characterized by slanting lateral, ventrolateral, and relatively incomplete dorsolateral stripes, a large tympanum, almost non-fringed toes with no webbing, and a broad abdomen. One male measured 18 mm (0.71 in) and two females 21 mm (0.83 in) in snout–vent length.

== Distribution ==
Hyloxalus cevallosi is native to the Pastaza Province in central Ecuador where it is present on the eastern side of the Andes between 480 and 1,040 m (1,575 and 3,412 ft) above sea level. it has been recorded from only three localities in the Pastaza Province. Records from elsewhere may refer to this species or Leucostethus fugax and require confirmation.

== Reproduction ==
Scientists infer that this frog reproduces the same way other frogs in Hyloxalus do: The female frog lays eggs on the ground. After the eggs hatch, the adult frogs carry the tadpoles to water.

== Status ==
Hyloxalus cevallosi is currently listed as "Endangered" by the IUCN on the IUCN Red List of Threatened Species and its population is decreasing. Members of the species live in three localities in a total space less than 500 square kilometers. It is threatened by habitat loss as the forests of the Amazonian foothills of the Andes are slowly disappearing due to agricultural development and logging. It is not known to live in any protected areas.
