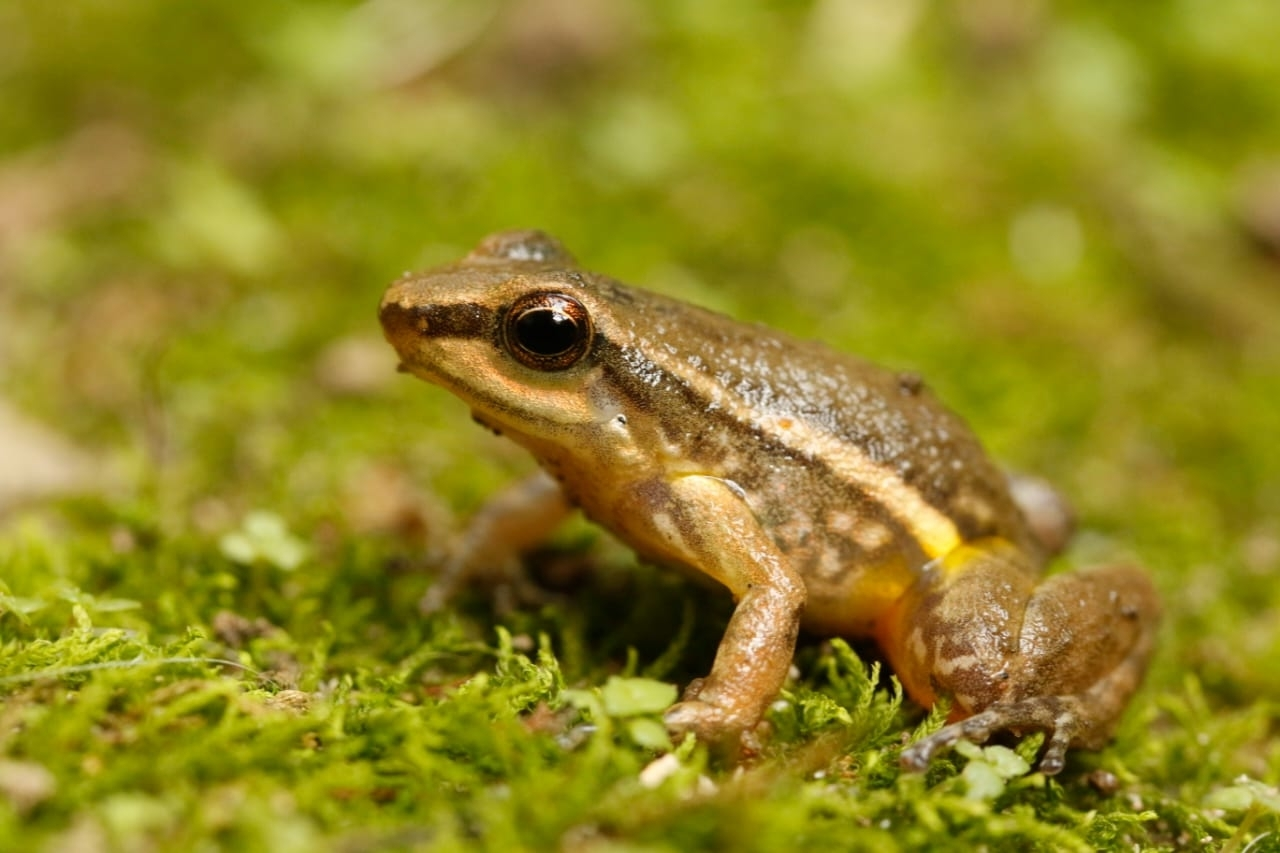

Conservation status
- Least Concern (IUCN 3.1)

Scientific classification
- Kingdom: Animalia
- Phylum: Chordata
- Class: Amphibia
- Order: Anura
- Family: Dendrobatidae
- Genus: Leucostethus
- Species: L. brachistriatus

Binomial name
- Leucostethus brachistriatus (Rivero and Serna, 1986)

Synonyms
- Colostethus brachistriatus Rivero and Serna, 1986

= Leucostethus brachistriatus =

Species of frog

Leucostethus brachistriatus is a species of frog in the family Dendrobatidae. It is endemic to Colombia and occurs on the western slopes of Cordillera Central and on Cordillera Occidental. Common name stripe-throated rocket frog has been proposed for it.

== Description ==
The holotype is a female measuring 22 mm (0.9 in) in snout–vent length. The tympanum is relatively large but partly concealed and not very conspicuous. The fingers have neither webbing nor lateral fringes. Basal webbing is present between the toes II–V. The dorsum is cream-colored. An oblique lateral band runs from the eye to the groin.

== Habitat and conservation ==
Leucostethus brachistriatus is a terrestrial frog found near streams in sub-Andean forests, where it has been observed about 1500 meters above sea level. It is common where forested habitat remains, but it is a very adaptable species that is also found in cropland and cow pastures. The eggs are deposited in leaf litter. The tadpoles are then carried to streams where they continue their development.

This species is not substantially threatened, although it can suffer from the forest loss that is occurring throughout its range. It is present in the Ucumari regional reserve and in the Barbas-Bremen Ecological Corridor.
