= Leucostethus dysprosium =

Conservation status
- Data Deficient (IUCN 3.1)

Scientific classification
- Kingdom: Animalia
- Phylum: Chordata
- Class: Amphibia
- Order: Anura
- Family: Dendrobatidae
- Genus: Leucostethus
- Species: L. dysprosium

Binomial name
- Leucostethus dysprosium (Rivero & Serna, 2000)

Synonyms
- Colostethus dysprosium Rivero and Serna, 2000

Species of frog

Leucostethus dysprosium is a species of frog in the family Dendrobatidae. It is endemic to Antioquia, Colombia.

The IUCN classifies this frog as data deficient. Scientists know little about its habits or the threats it faces. It has been observed exclusively in the type locality, Parque Nacional de Las Orquídeas, which is a protected area. This frog was observed 1300 and 1400 meters above sea level.

Scientists believe that the tadpoles do not develop in water.
