= Aguarunichthys inpai =

Scientific classification
- Kingdom: Animalia
- Phylum: Chordata
- Class: Actinopterygii
- Order: Siluriformes
- Family: Pimelodidae
- Genus: Aguarunichthys
- Species: A. inpai

Binomial name
- Aguarunichthys inpai Zuanon, Rapp Py-Daniel & Jégu, 1993

Species of fish

Aguarunichthys inpai is a species of benthopelagic catfish of the family Pimelodidae that is native to middle Amazon River basin of Brazil.

It grows to a maximum standard length of 42.0 cm (16.5 in).
