= Santiago-Comaina Reserved Zone =

Protected area in Peru

Coordinates: 4.20947°S 78.0359°W

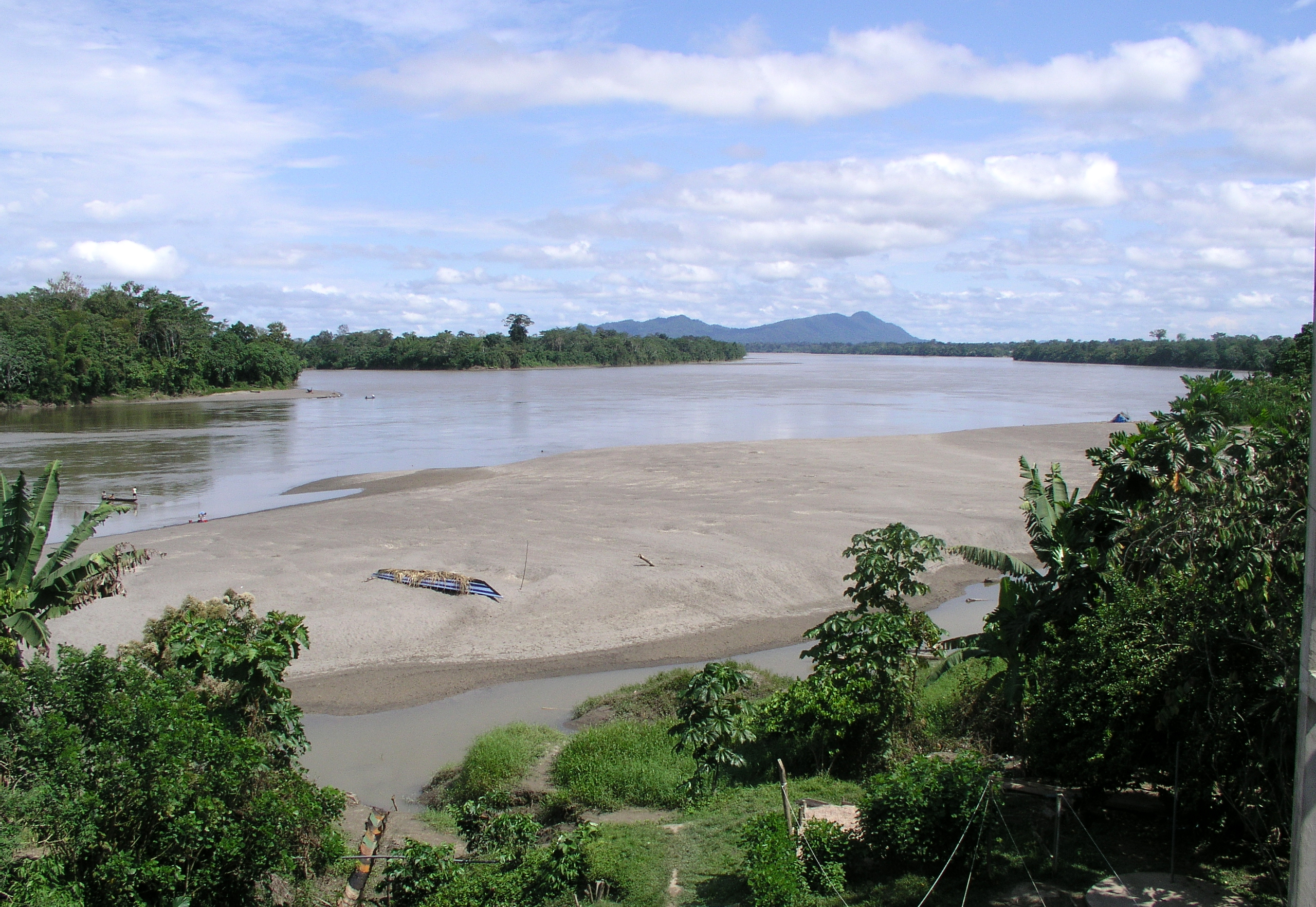
- Santiago River
- Interactive map of Santiago-Comaina Reserved Zone
- Location: Peru, Amazonas Region, Condorcanqui Province
- Area: 863,277 ha (2,133,200 acres)
- Established: January 21, 1999 (D.S. Nº 005-99-AG)

The Santiago-Comaina Reserved Zone (Spanish: Reserva Comunal Santiago-Comaina) is a protected area in Peru located in the Amazonas Region, Condorcanqui Province.

== See also ==
- List of protected areas of Peru
