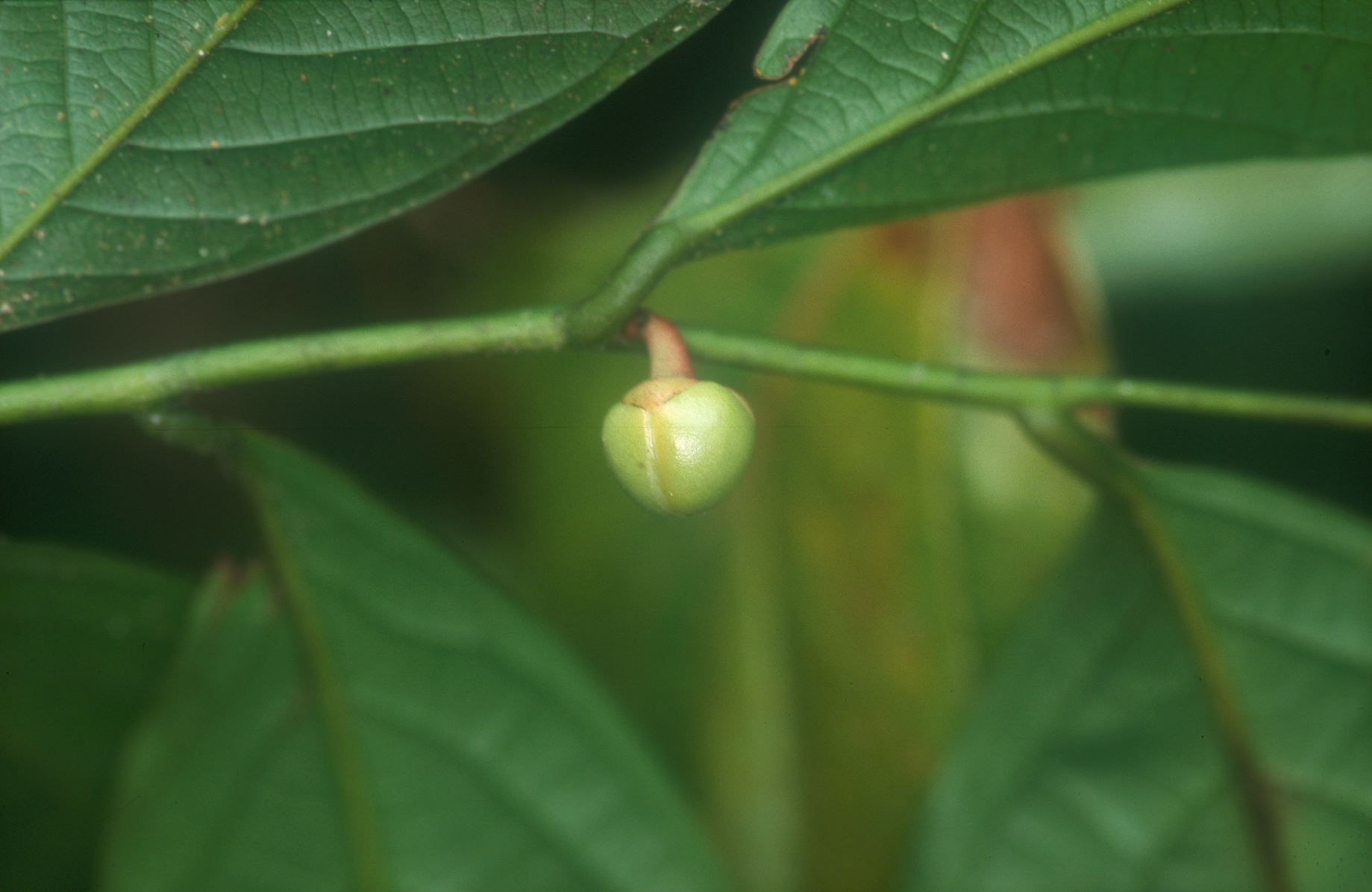
- In Amazonas, Peru

Conservation status
- Vulnerable (IUCN 3.1)

Scientific classification
- Kingdom: Plantae
- Clade: Embryophytes
- Clade: Tracheophytes
- Clade: Spermatophytes
- Clade: Angiosperms
- Clade: Magnoliids
- Order: Magnoliales
- Family: Annonaceae
- Genus: Cremastosperma
- Species: C. yamayakatense

Binomial name
- Cremastosperma yamayakatense Pirie

= Cremastosperma yamayakatense =

Species of plant

Cremastosperma yamayakatense is a species of tropical tree in the "soursop" family Annonaceae that is found in lowland rainforest in the Amazonas Region of northern Peru.
