= Leucostethus fugax =

Conservation status
- Vulnerable (IUCN 3.1)

Scientific classification
- Kingdom: Animalia
- Phylum: Chordata
- Class: Amphibia
- Order: Anura
- Family: Dendrobatidae
- Genus: Leucostethus
- Species: L. fugax

Binomial name
- Leucostethus fugax (Morales and Schulte, 1993)

Synonyms
- Colostethus fugax Morales & Schulte, 1993

Species of frog

Leucostethus fugax, also known as Pastaza rocket frog, is a species of frog in the family Dendrobatidae. It is endemic to the eastern slopes of the Cordillera Oriental, southern Ecuador. Although originally only known from the valley of Pastaza River, it is now known to be more widespread. Its known range extends close to the Peruvian border and its true range may include Peru.

== Description ==
Adult males measure 17.9–19.5 mm (0.7–0.8 in) and adult females 19.3–20.1 mm (0.8–0.8 in) in snout–vent length. Toes have basal webbing. An oblique lateral stripe is present and reaches the eye. The venter is immaculate cream. Adult males have a conspicuously swollen third or fourth finger.

== Etymology ==
Scientists gave this frog the Latin name fugax for "fugitive" because of the way the frog would jump from their hands, especially those of scientist Juan A. Rivero.

== Reproduction ==
Scientists have not reported any observations of the female frog laying eggs, but they infer that the tadpoles swim in streams like their congeners.

== Habitat and conservation ==
Leucostethus fugax inhabits moist forests in a transition zone between humid tropical forest and very humid premontane forest at elevations of 210–700 m (690–2,300 ft) above sea level. It can occur in both secondary and primary forest. It is threatened by habitat loss caused by agriculture and logging. It is present in the Podocarpus National Park. Its range overlaps with El Quimi Biological Reserve, although it has not been recorded there.
