= Nieva District =

Coordinates: 4°34′59″S 77°54′00″W

Nieva
- District
- Interactive map of Nieva
- Country: Peru
- Region: Amazonas
- Province: Condorcanqui
- Founded: May 18, 1984
- Capital: Santa María de Nieva

Government
  - Mayor: Hector Orlando Requejo Longinote

Area
  - Total: 4,484.63 km^{2} (1,731.53 sq mi)
- Elevation: 230 m (750 ft)

Population (2005 census)
  - Total: 23,526
  - Density: 5.2459/km^{2} (13.587/sq mi)
- Time zone: UTC-5 (PET)
- UBIGEO: 010401

Nieva District is one of three districts of the province Condorcanqui in Peru.
