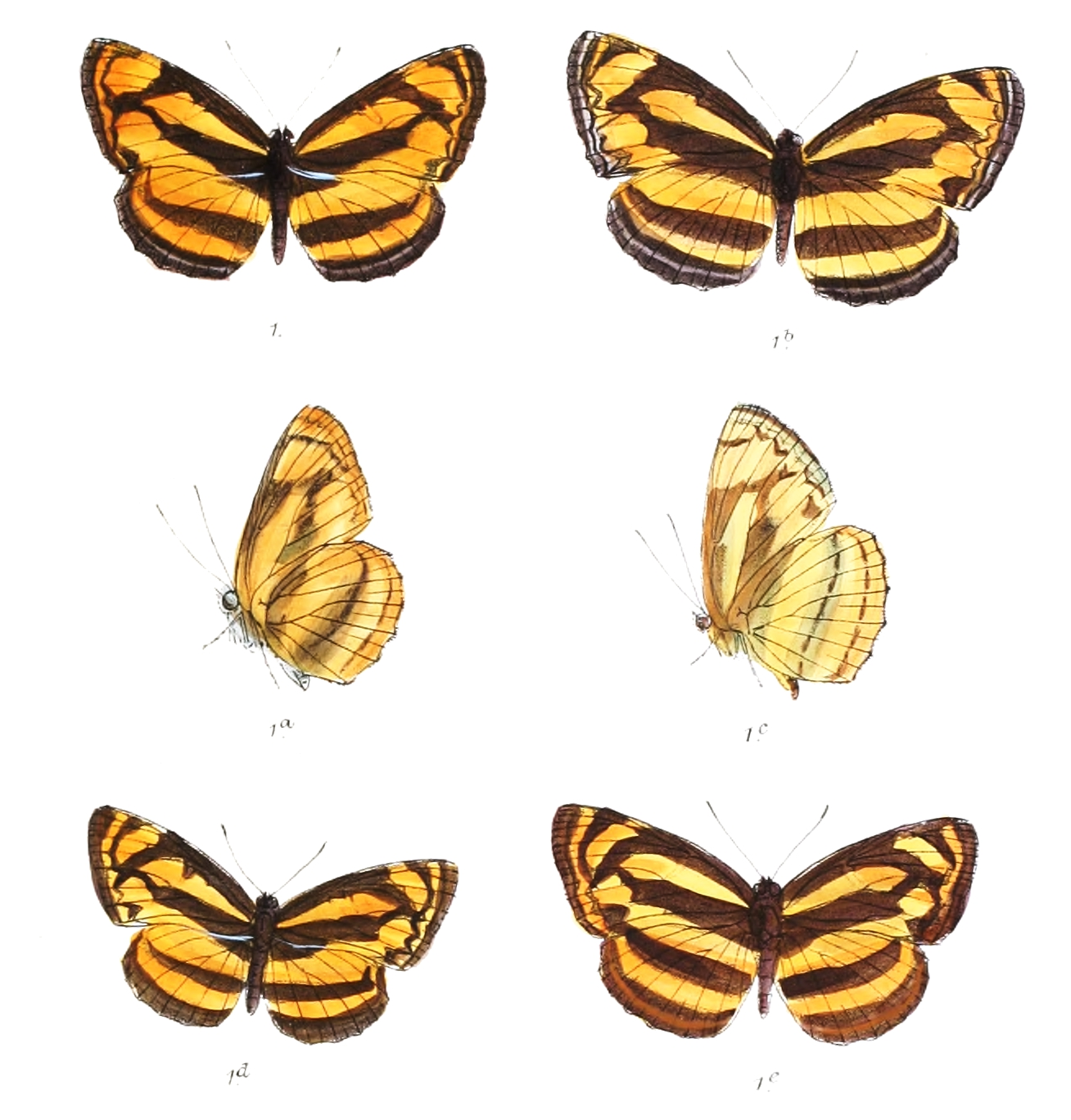
- Lasippa heliodore

Scientific classification
- Kingdom: Animalia
- Phylum: Arthropoda
- Clade: Pancrustacea
- Class: Insecta
- Order: Lepidoptera
- Family: Nymphalidae
- Subfamily: Limenitidinae
- Tribe: Neptini
- Genus: Lasippa; Moore, 1898

Species
- See text

Synonyms
- Bacalora Moore, 1898; Bisappa Moore, 1898; Palanda Moore, 1898; Pandassana Moore, 1898; Bisappa Moore, [1899]; Palanda Moore, [1899]; Lasippa Moore, [1899]; Bacalora Moore, [1899]

= Lasippa =

Genus of brush-footed butterflies

Lassipa is a genus of Asian butterflies distributed from India to Sulawesi. They resemble Neptis but are smaller and marked yellow not white.

== Species ==
- Lasippa bella (Staudinger, 1889)
- Lasippa ebusa (C. & R. Felder, 1863)
- Lasippa heliodore (Fabricius, 1787)
- Lasippa illigera (Eschscholtz, 1821)
- Lasippa illigerella (Staudinger, 1889)
- Lasippa monata (Weyenbergh, 1874)
- Lasippa neriphus (Hewitson, 1868)
- Lasippa nirvana Felder 1867
- Lasippa pata (Moore, 1858)
- Lasippa tiga (Moore, 1858)
- Lasippa viraja (Moore, 1872)
