= Leucostethus bilsa =

Conservation status
- Critically Endangered (IUCN 3.1)

Scientific classification
- Kingdom: Animalia
- Phylum: Chordata
- Class: Amphibia
- Order: Anura
- Family: Dendrobatidae
- Genus: Leucostethus
- Species: L. bilsa

Binomial name
- Leucostethus bilsa Vigle, Coloma, Santos, Hernandez-Nieto, Ortega-Andrade, Paluh, and Read, 2020

Species of frog

Leucostethus bilsa, the Bilsa white-chested frog, is a species of frog in the family Dendrobatidae. It is endemic to Ecuador.

== Description ==
The adult male frog measures 21.7–24.2 mm (0.85–0.95 in) long in snout-vent length and the adult female frog about 27.4–28.2 mm (1.08–1.11 in). The skin of the dorsum is brown in color, with some darker brown to gray with some black marks. The flanks are brown to black in color with a cream-white stripe on each side from the middle of the body to the vent. The black color stops at a defined stripe between the white belly and the yellow color where the legs (all four) meet the body. The adult frog has a white belly, but it can have gray spots on the throat and chest. The male frog's testicles can be white or gray in color. The upper lip is cream-white in color with some light gray. The upper parts of the feet are brown in color with three dark brown bands and one line.The bottoms of the feet are yellow. Other parts of the frog are light brown in color. The iris of the eye is yellow-gold in color with some copper or brown, with some small black marks.

== Etymology ==
Scientists named this frog for its type locality, the Reserva Biológica Bilsa, which is itself named for the nearby Bilsa River, one of many water sources it protects.

== Habitat ==
This frog is diurnal. Scientists observed it on the leaf litter near streams and on stream banks in primary and secondary forest between 426 and 515 metres (1,400 and 1,690 ft) above sea level. Scientists found it in the Reserva Biológica Bilsa, a private biological reserve.

== Reproduction ==
After the eggs hatch, the male frog carries the tadpoles to streams for further development. Scientists have observed the tadpoles in the water from August to June, so they infer the frog reproduces year-round.

== Threats ==
The IUCN classifies this frog as critically endangered. It has only been found in a small remnant of forest, the rest of which has been cut down for logging, palm oil plantations, and cattle grazing.
