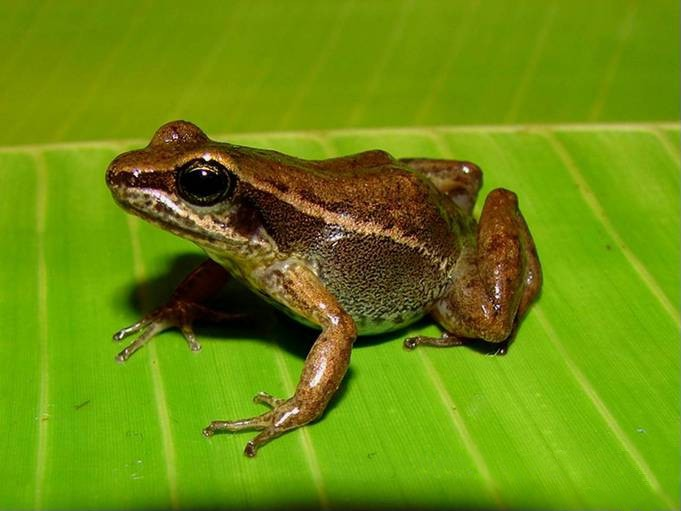

Conservation status
- Least Concern (IUCN 3.1)

Scientific classification
- Kingdom: Animalia
- Phylum: Chordata
- Class: Amphibia
- Order: Anura
- Family: Dendrobatidae
- Genus: Leucostethus
- Species: L. fraterdanieli

Binomial name
- Leucostethus fraterdanieli (Silverstone, 1971)

Synonyms
- Colostethus fraterdanieli Silverstone, 1971

= Leucostethus fraterdanieli =

Species of frog

Leucostethus fraterdanieli (common name: Santa Rita rocket frog) is a species of frog in the family Dendrobatidae. It is endemic to the Andes in Colombia (western slopes of the Cordillera Central and both slopes of the Cordillera Occidental). Colostethus yaguara might be its junior synonym.

== Habitat ==
This diurnal frog has been observed in wet places, sitting on the leaf litter in cloud forests and other tropical forests and occasionally on farms if there were streams nearby. This frog has been observed between 650 and 2750 meters above sea level.

The frog's known range includes more than one protected area, for example Parque Nacional Natural Farallones de Cali, Santuario de Flora y Fauna Otún Quimbaya, and Reserva Costa Rica.

== Reproduction ==
Scientists have seen tadpoles at many times of year, so they infer that the frog breeds continually. The female frog lays eggs in the leaf litter, guarded by the male. After the eggs hatch, the male frog carries the tadpoles to water. Scientists observed male frogs carrying 10 or 11 tadpoles at one time.

== Threats ==
The IUCN classifies this frog as least concern. What threat it faces comes from habitat loss associated with logging, agriculture, and livestock cultivation. Scientists also found that some specimens tested positive for the fungus Batrachochytrium dendrobatidis. B. dendrobatidis causes the disease chytridiomycosis, which kills amphibians. However, scientists are not certain of the level of threat this poses to this species.
