= Río Santiago District =

Coordinates: 3°59′S 78°07′W

Río Santiago
- District
- Interactive map of Río Santiago
- Country: Peru
- Region: Amazonas
- Province: Condorcanqui
- Founded: May 18, 1984
- Capital: Puerto Galilea

Government
  - Mayor: Segundo Flores Nahuarosa

Area
  - Total: 8,035.28 km^{2} (3,102.44 sq mi)
- Elevation: 200 m (660 ft)

Population (2005 census)
  - Total: 12,163
  - Density: 1.5137/km^{2} (3.9205/sq mi)
- Time zone: UTC-5 (PET)
- UBIGEO: 010403

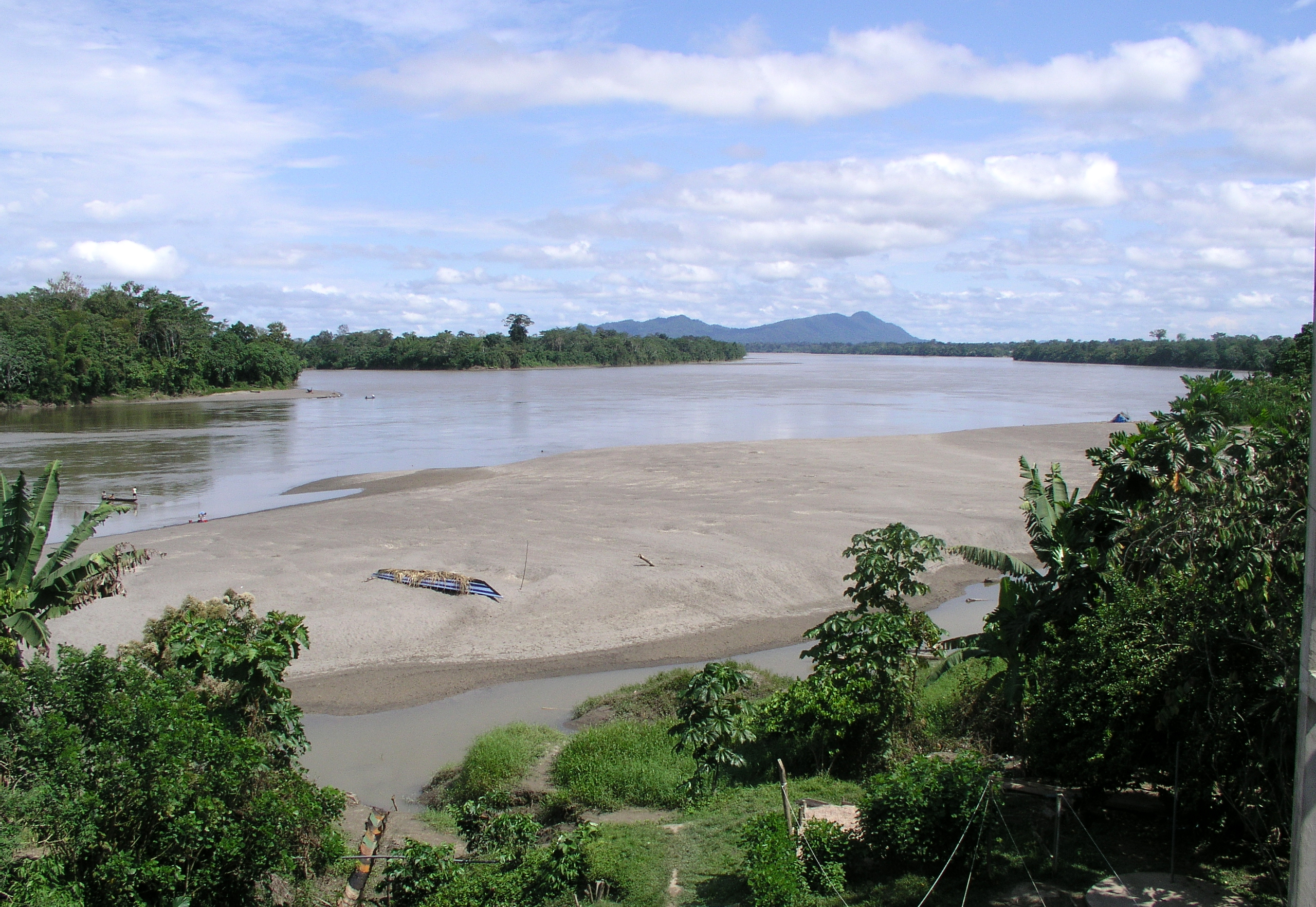
Santiago River, for which the district is named

Río Santiago District is one of three districts of the province Condorcanqui in Peru.
