= Emergency medical services in the United Kingdom =

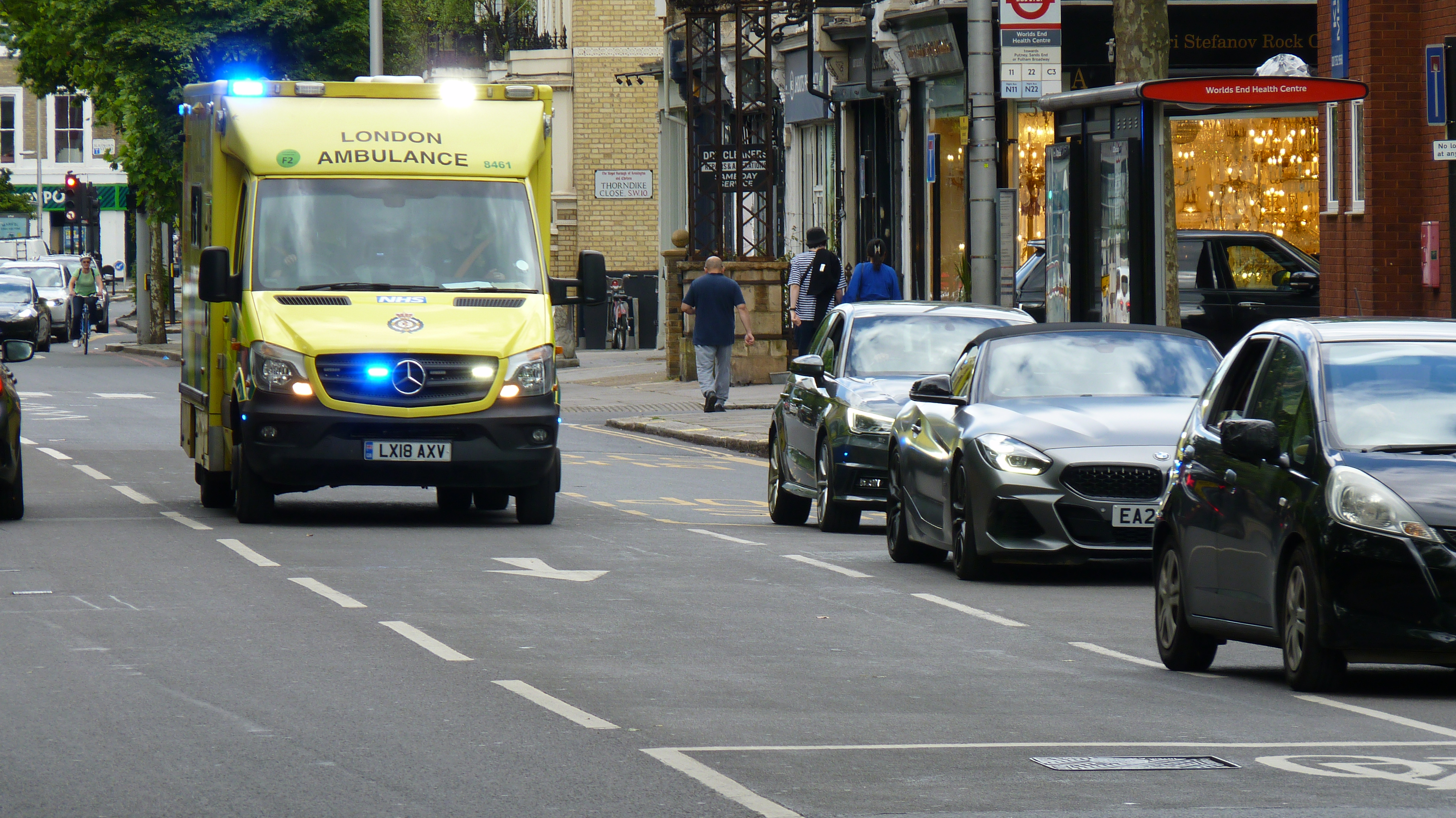
Mercedes-Benz Sprinter ambulance used by the NHS with blue lights and sirens on.

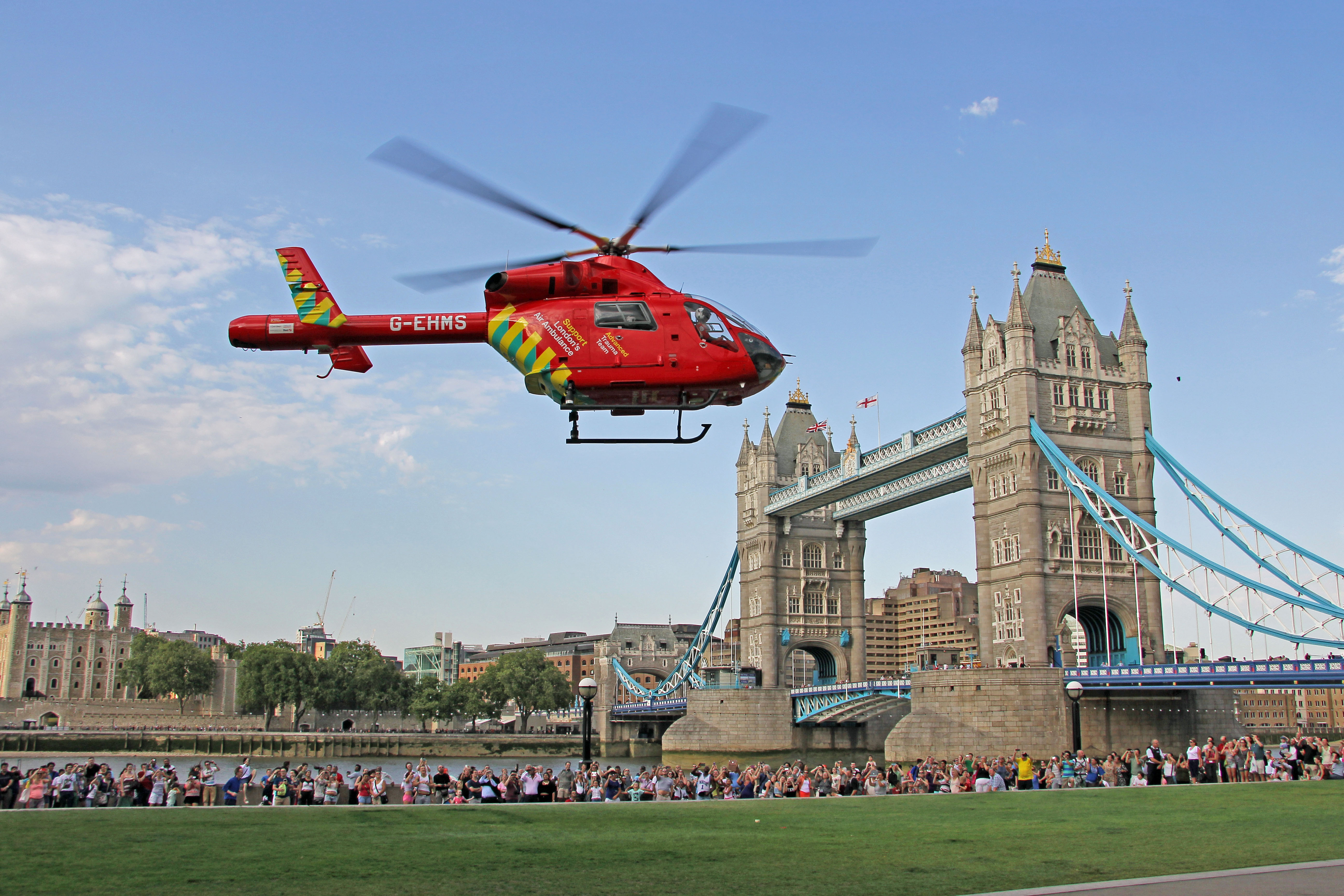
The London Air Ambulance in action

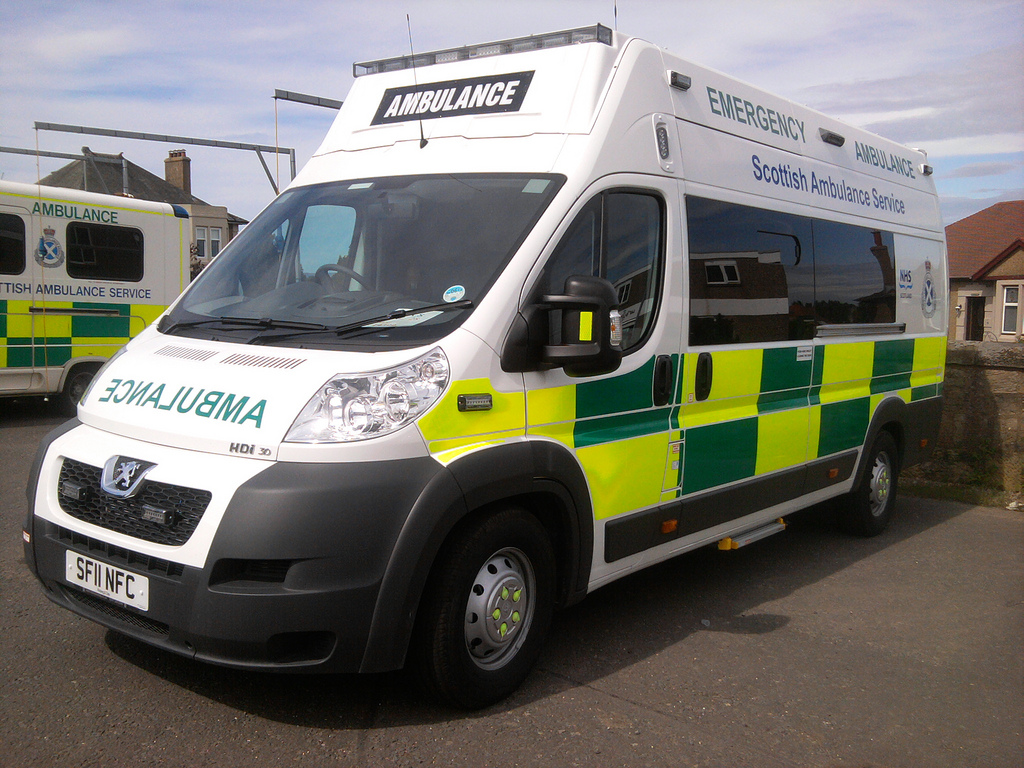
Peugeot Ambulance of the Scottish Ambulance Service

Emergency medical services in the United Kingdom provide emergency care to people with acute illness or injury and are predominantly provided free at the point of use by the four National Health Services (NHS) of England, Scotland, Wales, and Northern Ireland. Emergency care including ambulance and emergency department treatment is free to everyone including overseas visitors but ongoing care including admission to hospital as an inpatient is chargeable unless meeting criteria for NHS care free at the point of delivery.

The NHS commissions most emergency medical services through the 14 NHS organisations with ambulance responsibility across the UK (11 in England, one each in the other three countries).

As with other emergency services, the public normally access emergency medical services through one of the valid emergency telephone numbers (either 999 or 112).

In addition to ambulance services provided by NHS organisations, there are also some private and volunteer emergency medical services arrangements in place in the UK, the use of private or volunteer ambulances at public events or large private sites, and as part of community provision of services such as community first responders.

Apart from one service in Scotland, air ambulances in the United Kingdom are not part of the NHS and are funded through charitable donations, although paramedics and doctors may be seconded from a local NHS ambulance services and hospitals.

== Role of the ambulance services ==
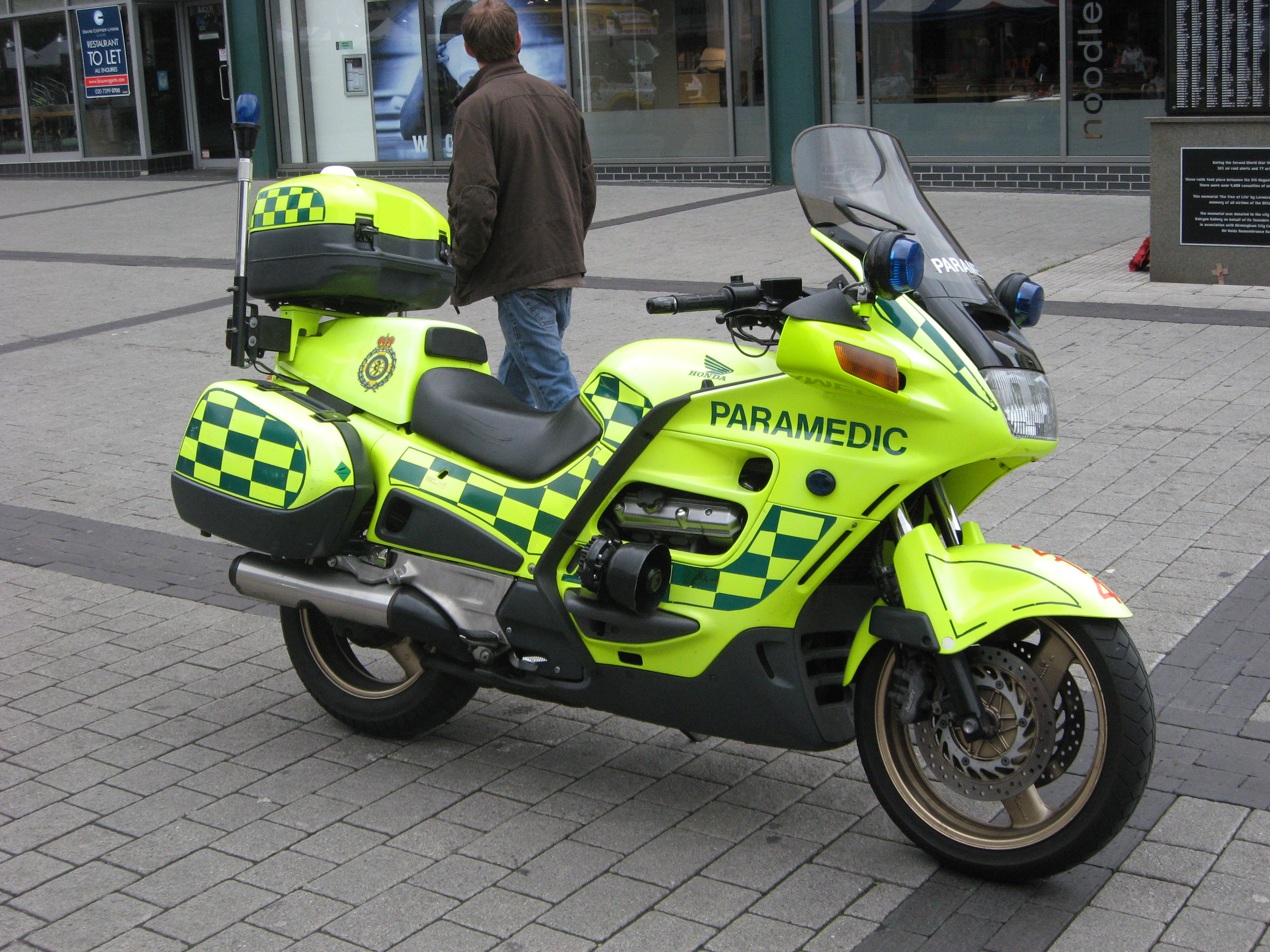
A paramedic's motorcycle in Birmingham in 2008

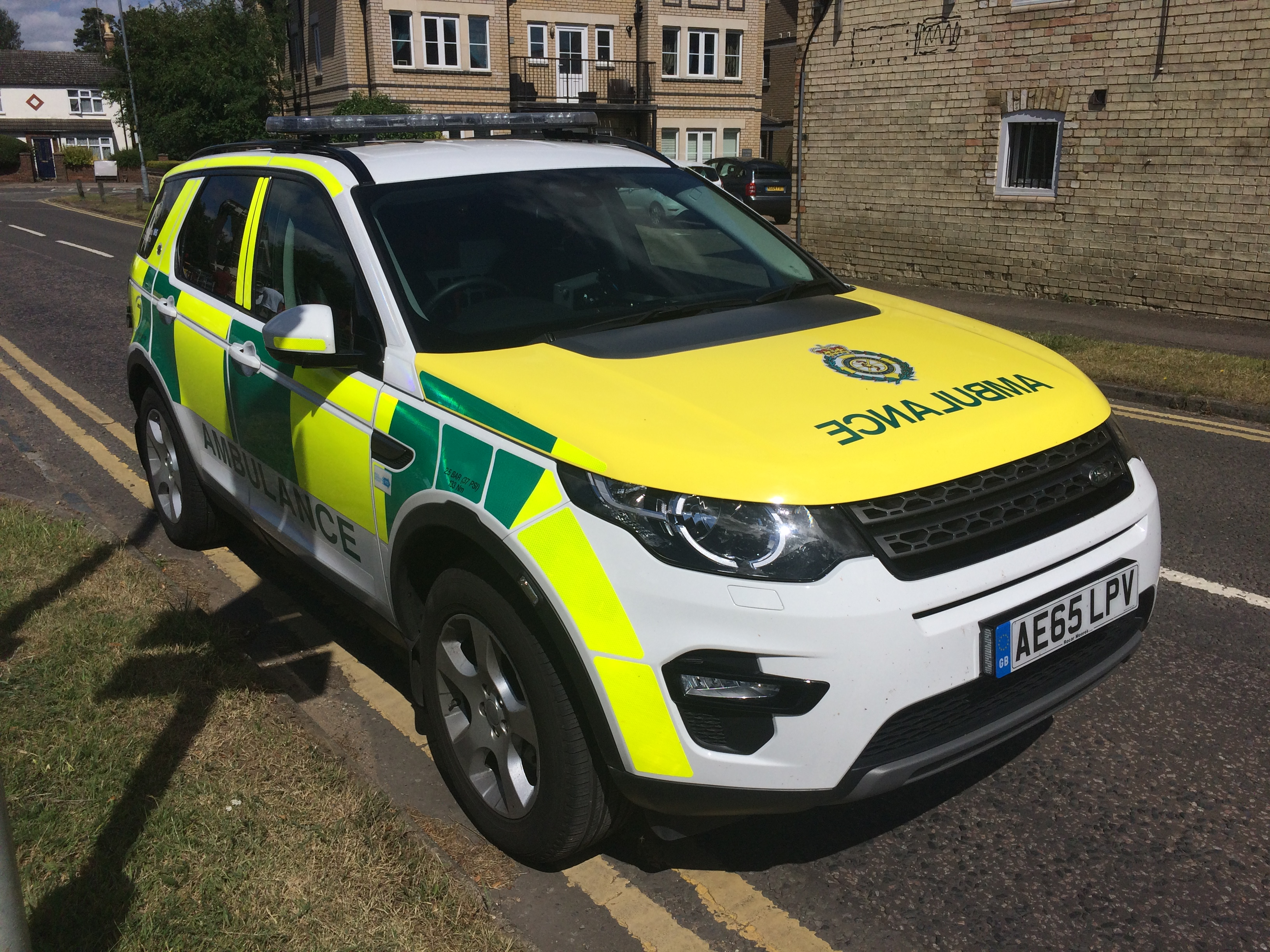
An East of England Ambulance Service Rapid Response Vehicle (RRV)

Public ambulance services across the UK are required by law to respond to four types of requests for care, which are:

- Emergency calls (via the 999 or 111 system)
- Doctor's urgent admission requests
- High dependency and urgent inter-hospital transfers
- Major incidents

Ambulance trusts and services may also undertake non-urgent patient transport services on a commercial arrangement with their local hospital trusts or health boards, or in some cases on directly funded government contracts, although these contracts are increasingly fulfilled by private and voluntary providers.

== History ==
The National Health Service Act 1946 gave county and borough councils a statutory responsibility to provide an emergency ambulance service, although they could contract a voluntary ambulance service to provide this, with many contracting the British Red Cross, St John Ambulance or another local provider. The Regional Ambulance Officers' Committee reported in 1979 that "There was considerable local variation in the quality of the service provided, particularly in relation to vehicles, staff and equipment. Most services were administered by local authorities through their Medical Officer of Health and his Ambulance Officer, a few were under the aegis of the fire service, whilst others relied upon agency methods for the provision of part or all of their services".

The 142 existing ambulance services were transferred by the National Health Service Reorganisation Act 1973 from local authority to central government control in 1974, and consolidated into 53 services under regional or area health authorities.

This led to the formation of predominantly county based ambulance services, which gradually merged up and changed responsibilities until 2006, when there were 31 NHS ambulance trusts in England.

The June 2005 report Taking healthcare to the Patient, authored by Peter Bradley, Chief Executive of the London Ambulance Service, for the Department of Health led to the merging of the 31 trusts into 13 organisations in England, plus one organisation each in Wales, Scotland, and Northern Ireland. Following further changes as part of the NHS foundation trust pathway, this has further reduced to ten ambulance service trusts in England, plus the Isle of Wight which has its own provision.

Following the passage of the Health and Social Care Act 2012, commissioning of the ambulance services in each area passed from central government control into the hands of regional clinical commissioning groups (CCG). Following the passage of the Health and Care Act 2022, from 1 July 2022 clinical commissioning groups were abolished and replaced by integrated care boards.

== Current public provision ==
The commissioners in each region are responsible for contracting with a suitable organisation to provide ambulance services within their geographical territory. The primary provider for each area is currently held by a public NHS body, of which there are 11 in England, and one each in the other three countries.

=== England ===
In England there are now ten NHS ambulance trusts, as well as an ambulance service on the Isle of Wight, run directly by Isle of Wight NHS Trust, with boundaries generally following those of the former regional government offices. The ten trusts are:

- East Midlands Ambulance Service NHS Trust
- East of England Ambulance Service NHS Trust
- London Ambulance Service NHS Trust
- North East Ambulance Service NHS Foundation Trust
- North West Ambulance Service NHS Trust
- South Central Ambulance Service NHS Foundation Trust
- South East Coast Ambulance Service NHS Foundation Trust
- South Western Ambulance Service NHS Foundation Trust
- West Midlands Ambulance Service University NHS Foundation Trust
- Yorkshire Ambulance Service NHS Trust

The English ambulance trusts are represented by the Association of Ambulance Chief Executives (AACE), with the Scottish, Welsh and Northern Irish providers all associate members. On 14 November 2018 West Midlands Ambulance Service became the UK's first university-ambulance trust.

=== Scotland ===
The service was operated before reorganisation in 1974 by the St Andrews Ambulance Association under contract to the Secretary of State for Scotland. The Scottish Ambulance Service is a Special Health Board that provides ambulance services throughout whole of Scotland, on behalf of the Health and Social Care Directorates of the Scottish Government.

Due to the remote nature of many areas of Scotland compared to the other Home Nations, the Scottish Ambulance Service has Britain's only publicly funded air ambulance service, with two Airbus Helicopters H145 helicopters and two Beechcraft B200C King Air fixed-wing aircraft. There is also a partnership to provide the Emergency Medical Retrieval Service which gives rapid access to the skills of a consultant in emergency or intensive care medicine using Scottish Ambulance Service road and air assets.

=== Northern Ireland ===
The Northern Ireland Ambulance Service (NIAS) was established in 1995 by order in council, and serves the whole of Northern Ireland.

=== Wales ===
The Welsh Ambulance Service NHS Trust (Welsh: Ymddiriedolaeth GIG Gwasanaethau Ambiwlans Cymru) was established on 1 April 1998. As of 2015 it had 2,500 staff providing ambulance and related services to the 2.9 million residents of Wales.

=== Isle of Man and Channel Islands ===
The Isle of Man and the Channel Islands of Jersey and Guernsey each have their own independent ambulance service.

- The Isle of Man Ambulance Service provides for 83,000 residents using four sites across the island and 42 staff members. This service is operated by the local government.
- The States of Jersey Ambulance Service is run by the local government taking around 14,000 calls a year. The service operated with 4 crews in service during the day. Additionally they are supported with community first responders and a volunteer support group.
- Guernsey Ambulance and Rescue Service is operated by St John Ambulance Guernsey. This service responds to 5,000 calls per year and is supported by community first responders. Unlike the NHS services on mainland UK there is a charge for using the service, or residents can pay an annual membership.

== Usage ==
Calls to the ambulance services across England have been steadily increasing in recent years, with a significant increase over the last two decades, as shown in the table below:

Year	Emergency calls
1994/95	2.61 million
2004/05	5.62 million
2006/07	6.3 million
2012/13	8.54 million
2013/14	8.47 million
2014/15	9 million
2015/16	9.4 million
2016/17	9.7 million
2017/18	8.6 million
2018/19	11.7 million
2019/20	12.4 million

Calls where a Category A ambulance arrived at the scene rose from 6,856 per day in 2011–12 to 8,564 per day in 2014–15.

=== Call categories ===
All ambulance services now operate under the Ambulance Response Programme, which enables dispatch of the most clinically appropriate vehicle to each patient within a timeframe that meets their clinical need. A set of pre-triage questions identifies those patients in need of the fastest response and then further triaging occurs to decide the severity of the injury or illness. Calls are categorised as such:

Category	Description	Explanation	Average response target	90th percentile response target
1	Life-threatening	A time critical life-threatening event requiring immediate intervention or resuscitation.	7 minutes	15 minutes
2	Emergency	Potentially serious conditions that may require rapid assessment and urgent on-scene intervention and/or urgent transport.	18 minutes	40 minutes
3	Urgent	An urgent problem (not immediately life-threatening) that needs treatment to relieve suffering and transport or assessment and management at the scene with referral where needed within a clinically appropriate timeframe.	None	2 hours
4	Less-urgent	Problems that are less urgent but require assessment and possibly transport within a clinically appropriate timeframe.	None	3 hours

== Staffing ==
There are a range of clinical staff grades that work in emergency medical services in the UK. The majority of staff fall into four main professional groups:

Title	Shorthand	FPHC PHEM	Description
Emergency Care Assistant Emergency Ambulance Crew Emergency Care Support Worker Intermediate Ambulance Practitioner Ambulance Support Crew	ECA EAC ECSW IAP; ASC	D or E	Usually work in support of a paramedic or technician, as part of a crew. They perform duties such as driving, first aid and conducting observations. There is a variation in training levels between providers, but typically they fall under grade D or most commonly grade E under the PHEM competency framework. Staff working at this grade are typically covered under the NHS Agenda for Change at band 3.
Emergency Medical Technician Ambulance Technician; Associate Ambulance Practitioner	EMT Tech; AAP	F	Either support paramedics, or work autonomously as non-registered health care professionals. Technicians have no single definition or qualification and their skills vary by service, especially between NHS and private providers. The skills of a clinician working at technician or AAP level fall under grade F under the PHEM competency framework designed by the Royal College of Surgeons Edinburgh (Faculty of Pre-Hospital Care). Staff working at this grade are typically covered under the NHS Agenda for Change at band 4 or band 5.
Paramedic	Para	G	Pre-hospital care practitioners, registered with the Health and Care Professions Council. Paramedics have autonomous practice and a range of skills including intravenous cannulation and advanced airway placement. As of 2020, pay starts between £26,000 to £35,000 depending on experience, typically landing on the NHS Agenda for Change band 5 (for newly qualified paramedics) or band 6. They typically hold a BSc education.
Ambulance Nurse; Pre-hospital Practitioner	AN; PHP	G	Nurses, registered with the Nursing and Midwifery Council. Ambulance nurses typically have experience working within an Emergency Department or Intensive Care Unit, or have completed an appropriate conversion course to pre-hospital practice. Nurses have autonomous practice and a range of skills as does a paramedic. Most nurses can administer the same mediation as paramedics, working under patient group directions. Ambulance nurses typically work at either band 5 or band 6 of the Agenda for Change.
Specialist Paramedic Advanced Paramedic	SP/SPCC/SPUC AP/APCC/APUC	H	Paramedics trained in extra skills and invasive procedures, traditionally only performed by doctors. This can include prescribing medication, administering additional drugs and surgical interventions. Roles include critical care paramedic, paramedic practitioner, HEMS paramedic and emergency care practitioner. These paramedics typically hold an MSc in Paramedicine, advanced practice or another advanced clinical topic. Staff working at this grade are typically covered under the NHS Agenda for Change at band 7-8b.
Consultant Paramedic	N/A	H	Highly experienced paramedics who have a very high level of clinical knowledge and skill, often in a core area or subject such as research or education. Typically operating from an office-based environment, they develop new and innovative ways to help and care for patients and, like advanced paramedics, they provide clinical leadership and guidance to other clinicians.
Doctor	N/A	H	Specialising in critical care medicine, emergency medicine or anaesthesia can often be seen in the pre-hospital field, working alongside NHS ambulance services via an air ambulances, BASICS scheme or BASICS Scotland. These typically spend some of their working week in a hospital setting, with the pre-hospital work being done on a voluntary basis – except in the case of air ambulance doctors who are seconded by their NHS trust on a semi-permanent basis.

There is also a range of support staff who work to support the clinical operations such as those in administration, logistics, vehicle preparation or the control room. Emergency Operations Centre staff may include:

- Call takers
- Dispatchers
- Clinical advisors
- Command/management staff

A full-time working week is 37.5 hours including night and weekend shifts as well as public holidays. Annual leave starts at 27 days per year plus public holidays or time in lieu and rising to 33 after ten years service. In 2014/5, Ambulance Trusts were forced to look overseas to fill vacancies for paramedics. Only one was recruited from outside the UK in 2013–4, but 183 had been recruited since April 2014. Of these, 175 were recruited by the London Ambulance Service from Australia. Across England, ambulance services reported that 1,382 of 15,887 posts were vacant – a rate of 9%.

Other clinical roles within the NHS ambulance services include ambulance nurse and similar specialist paramedic/nurse roles with a focus on admission avoidance.

== Supporting services ==
=== BASICS and BASICS Scotland ===
The British Association for Immediate Care coordinates voluntary schemes, and individual medical and allied health professionals, providing immediate care throughout England and Wales, with BASICS Scotland performing a similar role for Scotland. BASICS and BASICS Scotland doctors, nurses or paramedics may assist NHS paramedics at the scenes of serious accidents or be on-hand at major sporting events. All professionals volunteer their time, but doctors must have undergone additional training to support their working-environment. Within Scotland an increasing emphasis is on developing online teaching in rural prehospital care, to cater to the remote and rural areas of Scotland.

=== Blood bikes ===
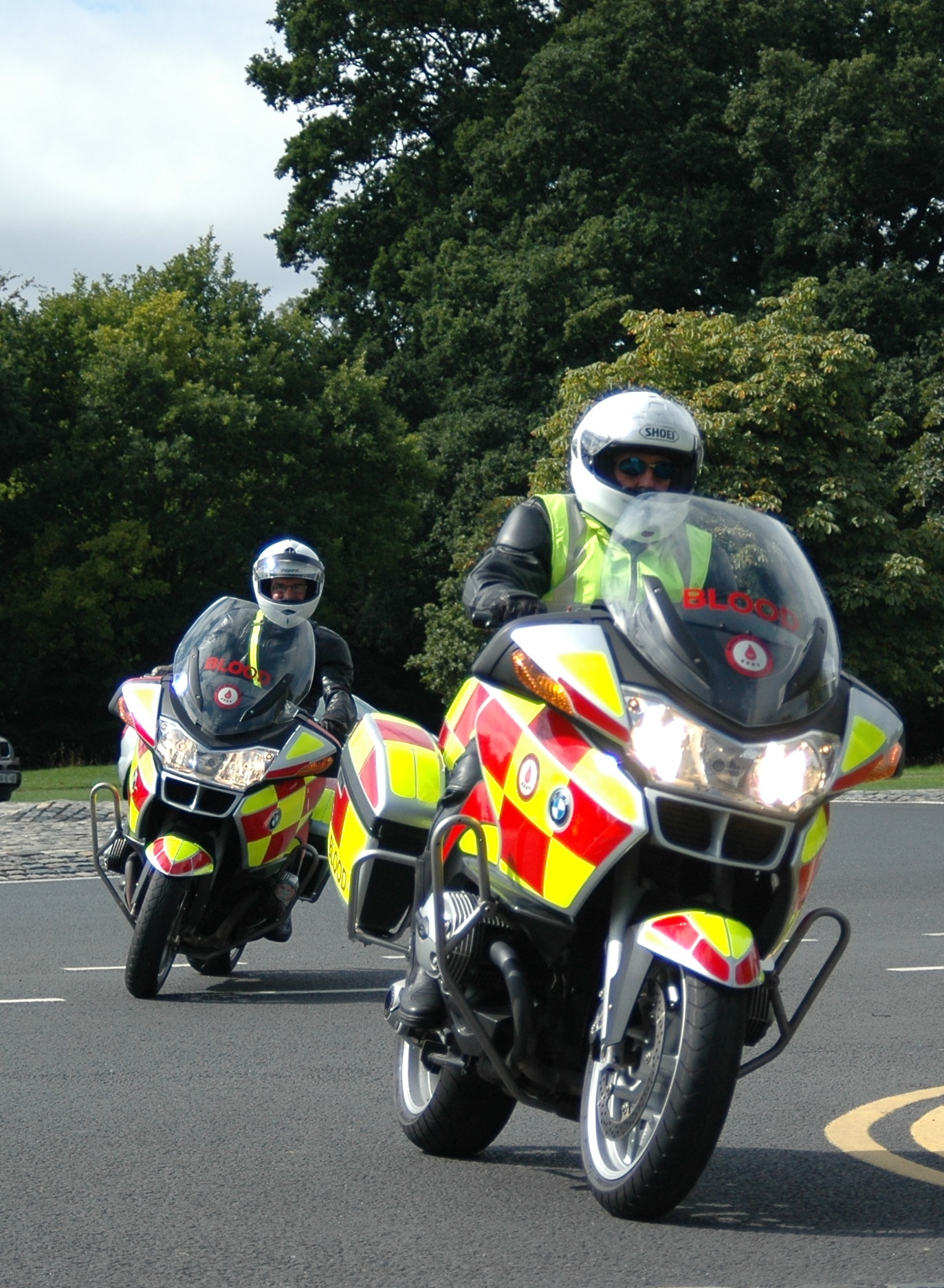
BMW R1200RT blood bikes

Across the United Kingdom, a network of volunteer blood bike charity groups provide motorcycle courier services for blood and pathology samples which require transport to, or between, hospitals, blood banks and medical laboratories. Some are equipped with blue lights and sirens which can be used when completing urgent requests for assistance. Groups are largely independent, and operate in collaboration with their local healthcare providers. Many are represented through the Nationwide Association of Blood Bikes (NABB).

=== Community first responders ===
Volunteer community first responders (CFRs) are now common place resources for NHS Ambulance Service. CFRs are members of the public who have received training to answer ambulance 999 calls, and respond immediately within their local area, during their own time. The schemes originated to provide defibrillation in rural and remote areas, where ambulances could not quickly respond, although they are now present in both rural and urban areas.

CFRs are often operated by a local group, in partnership with the regional NHS ambulance trust, and carry a defibrillator and oxygen, along with other equipment as decided by the clinical governance arrangements. Some schemes have their own vehicles and actively fundraise to support their schemes.

=== Fire service responders ===
In more rural areas where ambulance responses can take longer, fire personnel have been trained in basic first aid and pain management. They are trained in cardiopulmonary resuscitation (CPR), use of an automated external defibrillator (AED), oxygen and nitrous oxide. They normally receive a call from the ambulance emergency operations centre and respond in a car fitted with blue lights, sirens and ambulance / fire service livery. This service is normally staffed by retained firefighters.

== Ambulance auxiliary ==
In May 2022 NHS England tendered a contract worth up to £30 million for "auxiliary ambulance services". This is worth £7.5 million annually and is initially an eight-month contract. It covers both emergency and non-emergency ambulance crews "with the capacity to respond to callouts across categories one to four". This contract was awarded to St John Ambulance for a period of four years. The ambulance auxiliary will support local NHS Ambulance Service trusts to deliver care across England.

== Private, voluntary and charity ambulance services ==
There is a large market for private and voluntary ambulance services, with the sector being worth £800 million to the UK economy in 2012. Since April 2011, all ambulance providers operating in England have been required by law to be registered with the Care Quality Commission (CQC), under the same inspection regime as NHS services, and as of 2012 there were around 250 credentialled providers.

The primary activities of the private and voluntary services include:

- the provision of ambulances as part of a wider service of first aid at events, construction sites, film sets, or other private provision
- the provision of additional resource to NHS ambulance trusts
- urgent patient transport between points of care (such as between two hospitals)
- non-urgent patient transport

All providers, including NHS, private, and voluntary can bid for many of the available contracts for provision of ambulance services, and private ambulance services now undertake over half of hospital transfers. This places the voluntary providers in direct competition with private services, although the private sector has been growing at the expense of the voluntary services over time.

There is a duty on Category 1 responders (including the NHS) to make appropriate arrangements for major incidents, and as such private and voluntary ambulance services are generally included as part of local planning for the provision of ambulance services during major incidents, such as mass casualty events (including 7 July 2005 London bombings), adverse weather, or severe staff shortage.

=== Private ambulance services ===
Private ambulance services are common in the UK, with over 200 providers, and their use under contract to the NHS to answer 999 calls has been growing year on year, with every NHS ambulance trust using private providers in each year from 2011 to 2014, and contracted providers answering three-quarters of a million 999 calls in that three-year period. Expenditure on private ambulances in England increased from £37 million in 2011–12 to £67.5 million in 2013/4, rising in London from £796,000 to more than £8.8 million. In 2014–15, these 10 ambulance services spent £57.6 million on 333,329 callouts of private or voluntary services – an increase of 156% since 2010–11. This use of private contractors for frontline services has been politically controversial, although 56% of the British public believe that greater private sector involvement will help maintain or improve standards in the NHS.

In 2013, the CQC found 97% of private ambulance services to be providing good care. These private, registered services are represented by the Independent Ambulance Association. In 2017 the Commission warned all independent ambulance providers that during its inspections it had found "problems with the safety" of the care offered. 70 independent ambulance providers had been inspected and improvement notices had been issued to 25 out of 39 whose reports had been published. Plymouth Central Ambulance Service and Interim Medical and Rescue Services were closed down after very poor practice was found.

There are also a number of unregistered services operating, who do not provide ambulance transport, but only provide response on an event site. These firms are not regulated, and are not subject to the same checks as the registered providers, although they may operate similar vehicles, and offer near identical services.

=== Voluntary aid services ===
There are a number of voluntary ambulance providers, sometimes known as Voluntary Aid Services or Voluntary Aid Societies (VAS), with the main ones being the British Red Cross and St John Ambulance. The history of the voluntary ambulance services pre-dates any government organised service, and includes service in both World Wars.

As they are in direct competition for work with the private ambulance providers, the voluntary providers do operate with some paid ambulance staff to fulfil their contracts.

In the past, voluntary organisations have also provided cover for the public when unionised NHS ambulance trust staff have taken industrial action.

There are a number of smaller voluntary ambulance organisations, fulfilling specific purposes, such as Hatzalah who provide emergency medical services to the orthodox Jewish community in some cities. These have however run into difficulties due to use of vehicles not legally recognised as ambulances.

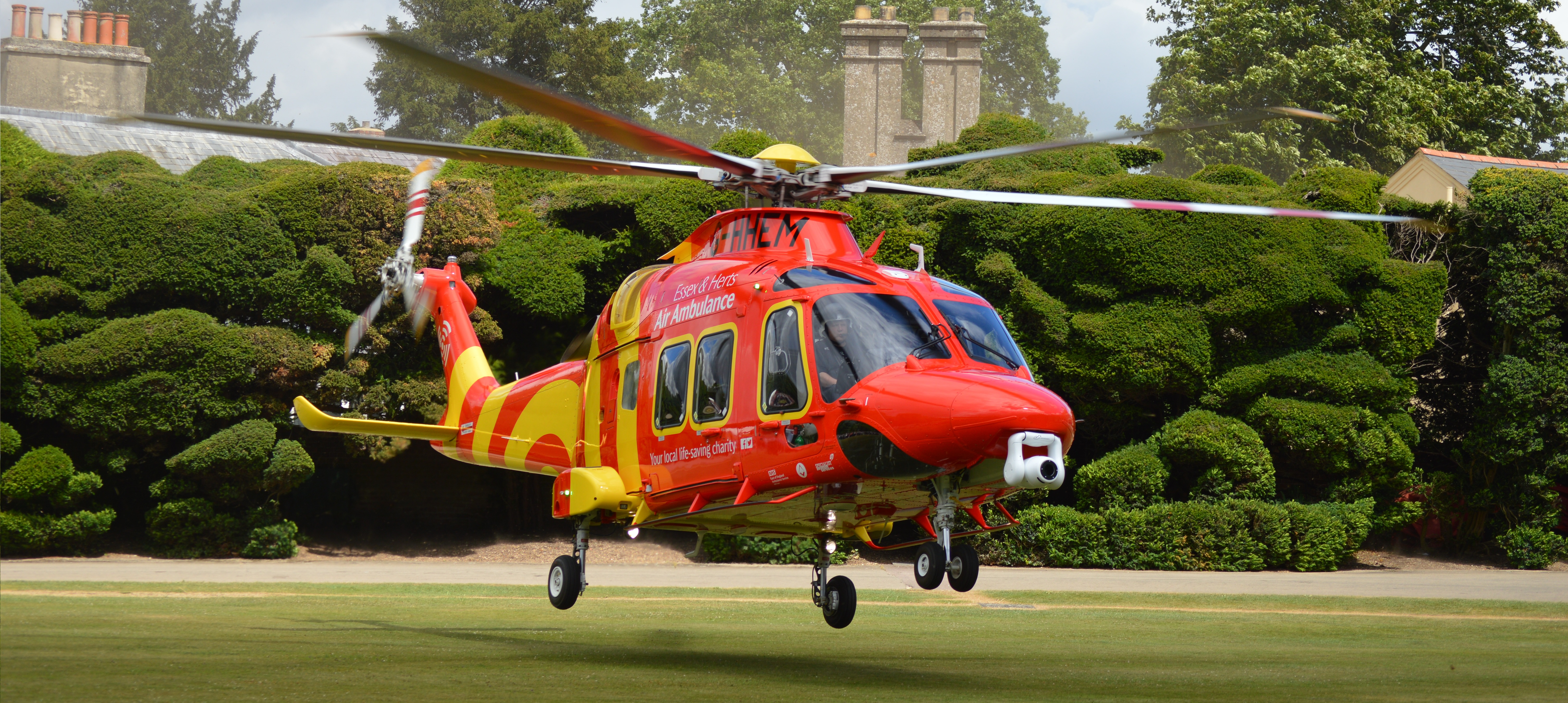
Essex & Herts Air Ambulance landing

=== Charity air ambulances ===
Most UK emergency air ambulances are funded by charitable organisations, with medical staff usually seconded from the local NHS ambulance services and hospitals. However, in Scotland, in addition to Scotland's Charity Air Ambulance, the Scottish Ambulance Service provides NHS funding for two helicopters for emergencies and two fixed wing aircraft for patient transfer. The Welsh Assembly Government fully funds the clinical and road components of Emergency Medical Retrieval and Transfer Service (EMRTS Cymru), with helicopter transfer provided in partnership with the Wales Air Ambulance and Children's Wales Air Ambulance charities.

Private air ambulances also carry out patient transfer or medical repatriation back to the United Kingdom.

== Regulation, governance and monitoring ==
All emergency medical services in the UK are subject to a range of legal and regulatory requirements, and in many cases are also monitored for performance. This framework is largely statutory in nature, being mandated by government through a range of primary and secondary legislation.

=== Regulation ===
In England all ambulance services, as well as some medical response organisations like BASICS, are regulated by the CQC under the provisions of the Health and Social Care Act 2008 and subsequent Health and Social Care Act 2008 (Regulated Activities) Regulations 2010.

This requires all providers to register, to meet certain standards of quality, and to submit to inspection of those standards. Organisations not meeting the standards can be sanctioned, or have their registration removed, preventing them from offering any medical services.

The CQC replaced the previous regulator of England's NHS ambulance services, the Healthcare Commission, with its remit expanded to include all private and voluntary providers. Independent ambulance services have only been subject to formal regulation since 2011.

In addition to regulation by the CQC on matters of service provision, providers of NHS services are also subject to regulation by either Monitor (for NHS foundation trusts or private providers) or the NHS Trust Development Authority (for NHS services who are not yet foundation trusts) for economic and financial matters.

=== Measuring performance ===
The performance of every NHS ambulance provider is measured and benchmarked by the government. Commonly called 'ORCON', after the consultancy used to formulate them, the New Ambulance Performance Standards (NAPS) were developed in the 1990s, and merged into the Clinical Quality Indicators used subsequently. New targets were established in July 2017. See NHS ambulance services.

The benchmarked targets include:

- Service experience – patient satisfaction with the service
- Outcome from acute STEMI – the number of patients who recover from a heart attack
- Outcome from cardiac arrest – the number of patients who get a return of spontaneous circulation and those who are discharged from hospital
- Outcome following stroke
- Proportion of calls closed with telephone advice – also known as "hear and treat"
- Proportion of calls managed without transport to A&E – also known as "see and treat"
- Recontact rate following discharge of care – patients who have had 'hear and treat' or 'see and treat' and who subsequently call 999 again
- Call abandonment rate – the number of people who do not get through to an ambulance dispatcher
- Time to answer calls – the time it takes to answer the phone
- Time until treatment by an ambulance – the wait time between calling and a health care professional being dispatched
- Category A response time – in cases triaged as Category A (life-threatening) by the triage software (AMPDS and NHS Pathways are the two approved systems), services are targeted to reach the patient within eight minutes of the call. In England, ambulance services are targeted on reaching 75% of Category A calls in 8 minutes, compared to 65% in Wales.

=== Governance ===
Every ambulance provider is responsible to the CQC for compliance with best practice. Best practice guidance is published by the Joint Royal Colleges Ambulance Liaison Committee (JRCALC), and most providers follow the majority of this issued guidance.

== Performance ==
In March 2022 average waits for an ambulance for stroke and heart attack patients (category 2) reached as long as two hours in some regions. The national target for reaching them is 18 minutes. According to the Association of Ambulance Chief Executives more than 3,000 patients may have suffered "severe harm" from ambulance delays in February 2022.

=== Patients waiting in ambulances ===
The number of patients waiting over an hour in an ambulance at a hospital before being admitted doubled in two years. 51,115 patients waited over an hour in 2014–15 which rose to 111,524 in 2016–17. There is concern that delays in diagnosis can put patients at risk. NHS Improvement said: "Tolerating ambulance handover delays is tolerating significant risk of harm to patients."

=== Speeding ===
Ambulance vehicles responding to emergencies (blue lights and sirens) are exempt from speed limits under Section 87 of the Road Traffic Regulation Act 1984.

Between 2009 and 2014, English ambulance trusts were issued with 23,227 speeding tickets after vehicles were caught on speed cameras. Only 400 tickets were upheld. Trust staff are employed to check against the 999 incident logging information for the date and time of the ticket whether the vehicle was on an emergency call.

== See also ==
- Fire services in the United Kingdom
- NHS ambulance services
- NHS 111
- List of United Kingdom uniformed services

General:

- Emergency medical services
- Health care in the United Kingdom
