= Chachapoya culture =

Pre-Inca Andean culture

Chachapoya
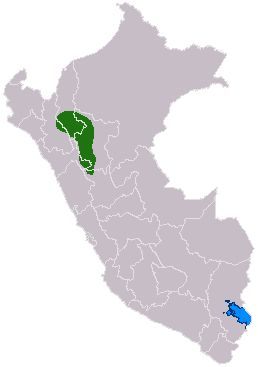
- Map of the Chachapoya culture
- Geographical range: Amazonas, Peru
- Period: Late Intermediate
- Dates: c. 800 - 1470
- Preceded by: Wari
- Followed by: Inca Empire

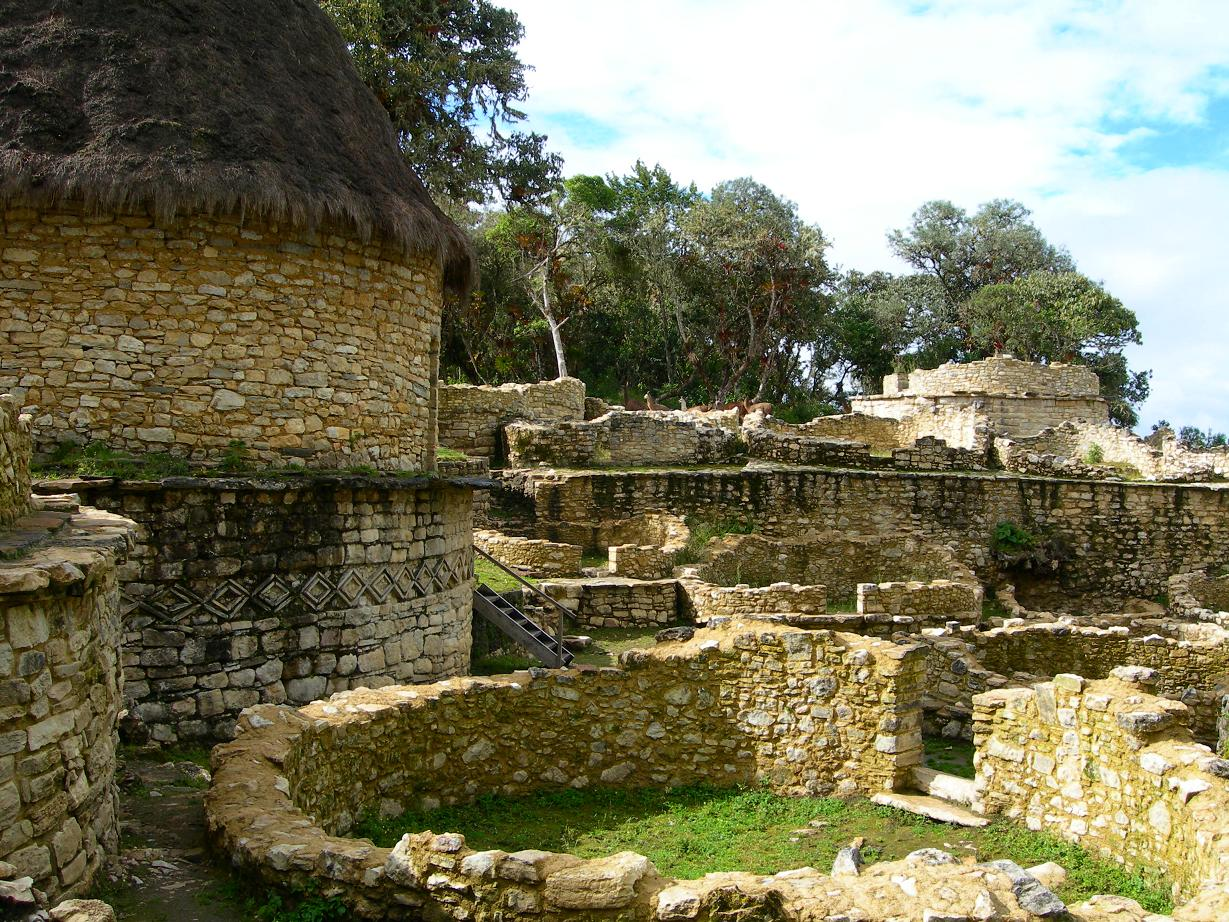
Inside Kuélap

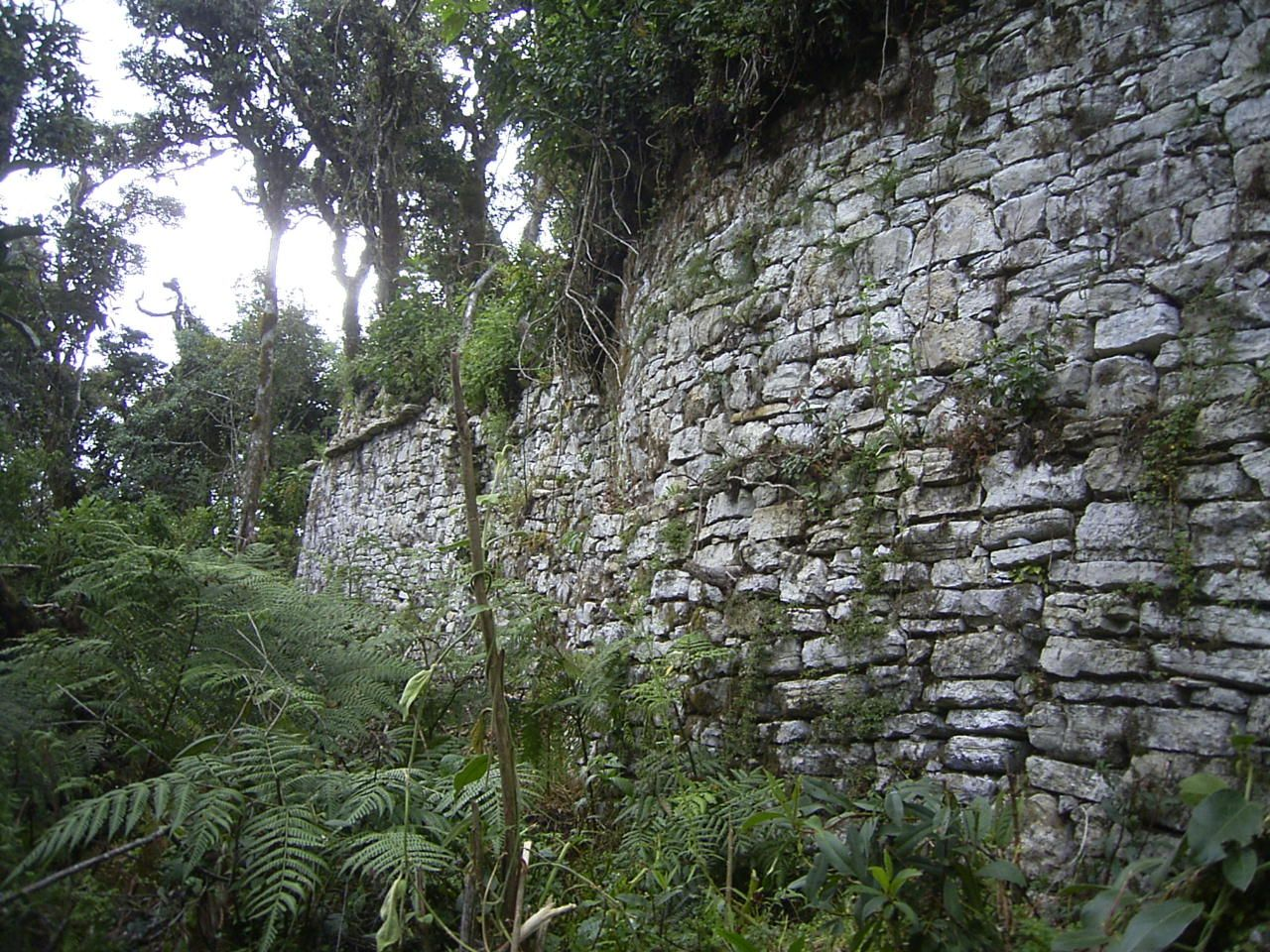
Walls of Soloco fortress, Chachapoyas, Peru

The Chachapoyas, also called the "Warriors of the Clouds," were a culture of the Andes living in the cloud forests of the southern part of the Department of Amazonas of present-day Peru. The Inca Empire conquered their civilization shortly before the Spanish conquest in the 16th century. At the time of the arrival of the conquistadores, the Chachapoyas were one of the many nations ruled by the Incas, although their incorporation had been difficult due to their constant resistance to Inca troops.

Since the Incas and conquistadors were the principal sources of information on the Chachapoyas, little first-hand or contrasting knowledge of the Chachapoyas has been found. Writings by the major chroniclers of the time, such as Inca Garcilaso de la Vega, were based on fragmentary, second-hand accounts. Much of what is known about the Chachapoya culture is based on archaeological evidence from ruins, pottery, tombs, and other artifacts. Spanish chronicler Pedro Cieza de León noted that, after their annexation to the Inca Empire, they adopted customs imposed by the Cusco-based Inca. By the 18th century, the Chachapoyas had been devastated, but they remain distinct within the indigenous peoples of modern Peru.

The poorly known Chachapoya language is thought by some to be related to the Cahuapanan languages.

== Etymology ==
The name Chachapoya was given to this culture by the Inca; the name that these people used to refer to themselves is not known. The meaning of the word Chachapoya may be derived from the Quechua sach'a phuyu (sach'a = tree, phuyu = cloud) meaning "cloud forest." Another possibility is that it may derive from sach'a-p-qulla (sach'a = tree, p = of the, qulla = the name of a pre-Inca kingdom from Puno) that the Incas used as a collective term for the many kingdoms around Lake Titicaca, the equivalent of "qulla people who live in the woods."

== Geography ==
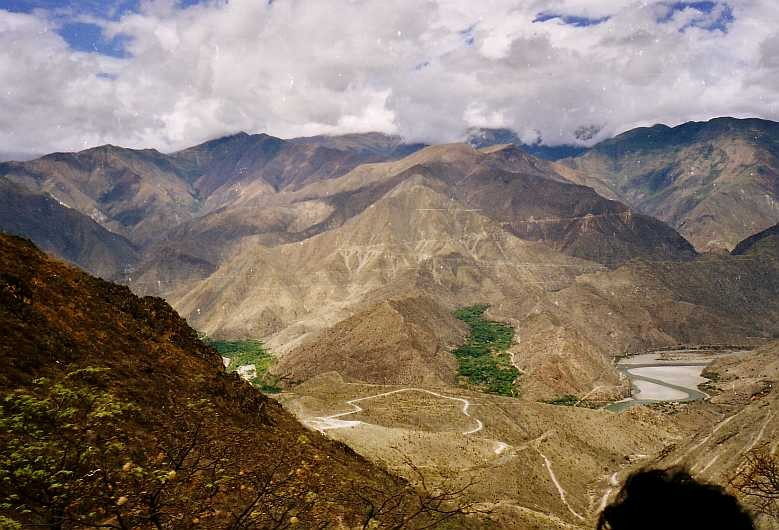
Valley of the Marañón River between Chachapoyas, Peru (Leimebamba District), and Celendín

The Chachapoyas' territory was located on the eastern slopes of the Andes, in present-day northern Peru. It encompassed the triangular region formed by the confluence of the Marañón River and the Utcubamba in Bagua Province, up to the basin of the Abiseo River where the Gran Pajáten is located. This territory also included land to the south up to the Chuntayaku River, exceeding the limits of the current Amazonas Region towards the south. The center of the Chachapoya culture, though, was the basin of the Utcubamba River. Due to the great size of the Marañón River and the surrounding mountainous terrain, the region was relatively isolated from the coast and other areas of Peru, although archaeological evidence shows some interaction between the Chachapoyas and other cultures.

The contemporary Peruvian city of Chachapoyas, Peru, derives its name from the word for this ancient culture, as does the defined architectural style. Inca Garcilaso de la Vega noted that the Chachapoyas territory was extensive:

Their territory, which measured 50 by 20 leagues, without counting the Muyupampa region, where it was 30 leagues wider still, might well be called a kingdom, rather than a province.

The area of the Chachapoyas is sometimes referred to as the "Amazonian Andes" due to its being part of a mountain range covered by dense tropical forest. The Amazonian Andes constitute the eastern flank of the Andes, which were once covered by dense Amazon vegetation. The region extended from the cordillera spurs up to elevations where primary forests still stand, usually above 3,500 m (11,500 ft). The cultural realm of the Amazonian Andes occupied land situated between 2,000 and 3,000 m (6,600 and 9,800 ft) in elevation.

== History ==
The Cachapoya Culture started around the year 800 and continued until the conquest by the Inca in about 1470, though some elements of the Cachapoya continued until the Spanish conquest of the Inca in the 1500s. The period from the adoption of ceramic technology until conquest, around 1400 to 1450 AD, is called the "Initial Period Manachaqui phase."

Following the Inca conquest, multiple available sources point to how the Chachapoya responded to said conquest. While archaeological evidence shows both Inca and Chachapoya settlements in the area, suggesting that they accepted Inca rule over their lands, historical sources say that the Chachapoya had more of a rebellious attitude towards their conquerors.

== Archaeological sites ==
The major urban centers, such as the great fortress of Kuelap, with more than 400 interior buildings and massive exterior stone walls reaching upwards of 60 ft (18 m) in height, and Gran Pajatén possibly served to defend against the Wari culture around 800 AD, a Middle Horizon culture that covered much of the coast and highlands. Referred to as the "Machu Picchu of the north," Kuélap receives few visitors due to its remote location.

Other archaeological sites in the region include the settlement of Gran Saposoa, the Atumpucro complex, and the burial sites at Revash and Laguna de las Momias ("Mummy Lake"), among others. It is estimated that only 5% of Chachapoya sites have been excavated according to a BBC documentary from January 2013.

Archaeological research in the early 2020s has documented more findings. Use of lidar scanning and photogrammetry has facilitated the slow revelation of features of Chachapoya settlements that have been obscured by heavy vegetation. Careful excavation and conservation at Chachapoya sites is leading to much more information about the distinctively egalitarian culture that predated the Inca by more than six centuries, flourishing from around AD 800.

=== Inca occupation and forced resettlement ===
The conquest of the Chachapoyas by the Inca Empire took place, according to Garcilaso, during the government of Tupac Inca Yupanqui in the second half of the 15th century. He recounts that the warlike actions began in Pias, a community on a mountain on the edge of Chachapoyas territory likely to the southwest of Gran Pajatén.

According to de la Vega, the Chachapoyas anticipated an Inca incursion and began preparations to withstand it at least two years earlier. The chronicle of Pedro Cieza de León also documents Chachapoya resistance. During the time of Huayna Capac's regime, the Chachapoyas rebelled:

all of his governors and ministers having been killed, along with a great number of soldiers, and others taken into slavery.

In response, Huayna Capac, who was in the Ecuadorian Cañaris' land at the time, sent messengers to negotiate peace, but again "his messengers were greeted with threats of death." Huayna Capac then ordered an attack. He crossed the Marañón over a bridge of wooden rafts that he ordered to be built, probably near Balsas District near Celendín.

From here, Inca troops proceeded to Cajamarquilla (now in Bolívar Province, Peru), with the intention to "raze the entire country" of the Chachapoyas. From Cajamarquilla, a delegation of women came to meet them, led by a matron who was a former concubine of Tupac Inca Yupanqui, Huayna Capac's father. They asked for mercy and forgiveness, which the Sapa Inca granted them. In memory of this event of a peace agreement, the place where the negotiation had taken place was declared sacred and closed so from that point on, "no creature, man or beast, should ever set foot upon it."

To assure the pacification of the Chachapoyas, the Incas installed garrisons in the region. They also arranged the transfer of groups of villagers under the system of mitma (forced resettlement):

It gave them grounds to work and places for houses not much far from a hill that is next to the city (Cusco) called Carmenga.

The Inca presence in the territory of Chachapoyas left structures at Quchapampa, Amazonas, in the outskirts of the Utcubamba in the current Leimebamba District, as well as other sites.

In the 15th century, the Inca empire expanded to incorporate the Chachapoyas region. Although fortifications such as the citadel at Kuélap may have been an adequate defense against the invading Inca, by this time the Chachapoyas settlements may have become decentralized and fragmented after the threat of Wari invasion had dissipated. The Chachapoyas were conquered by Inca ruler Tupac Inca Yupanqui around 1475. The defeat of the Chachapoyas was fairly swift, although smaller rebellions continued for many years. Using the mitma system of ethnic dispersion, the Inca attempted to quell these rebellions by forcing large numbers of Chachapoya people to resettle in remote locations of the empire.

When civil war broke out within the Inca empire, the Chachapoyas were located on middle ground between the northern capital at Quito, ruled by Atahualpa, and the southern capital at Cusco, ruled by Atahualpa's brother, Huáscar. Many of the Chachapoyas were conscripted into Huáscar's army, and heavy casualties ensued. After Atahualpa's eventual victory, many more of the Chachapoyas were executed or deported due to their former allegiance with Huáscar.

Due to the harsh treatment of the Chachapoyas during the years of subjugation, many of the Chachapoyas initially chose to side with the Spanish conquistadors when they arrived in Peru. Huaman, a local ruler from Quchapampa, pledged his allegiance to conquistador Francisco Pizarro after the capture of Atahualpa in Cajamarca. The Spanish moved in and occupied Cochabamba, extorting from the local inhabitants whatever riches they could find.

During Manco Inca Yupanqui's rebellion against the Spanish Empire, his emissaries enlisted the help of a group of Chachapoyas, but Huaman's supporters remained loyal to the Spaniards. By 1547, a large faction of Spanish soldiers arrived in the city of Chachapoyas, effectively ending the Chachapoyas' independence. Residents were relocated to Spanish-style towns, often with members of several different ayllu occupying the same settlement. Disease, poverty, and attrition led to severe decreases in population; by some accounts, the population of the Chachapoyas region decreased by 90% over the course of 200 years after the arrival of the Spanish.

Choquequirao, an Incan site in southern Peru close to Machu Picchu, was in part built by mitmaqkuna of Chachapoyan origin during the regime of Tupac Inca Yupanqui.

== Appearance and origins ==
Cieza de León remarked that among the indigenous Peruvians, the Chachapoyas were unusually fair-skinned and famously beautiful:

They are the whitest and most handsome of all the people that I have seen in Indies, and their wives were so beautiful that because of their gentleness, many of them deserved to be the Incas' wives and to also be taken to the Sun Temple (...) The women and their husbands always dressed in woolen clothes and in their heads they wear their llautos, which are a sign they wear to be known everywhere.

— "The Incas", Pedro de Cieza de Leon, Chapter 27

However, no other account at the time from other travelers to the region mentions the particular "whiteness" of the Chachapoyas. These comments have led to claims, not supported by Cieza de León's chronicle, that the Chachapoyas were blond-haired and European in appearance. The chronicle's use of the term "white" here antedates its emergence as a racial classification. Another Spanish author, Pedro Pizarro, described all indigenous Peruvians as "white." Although some authors have quoted Pizarro saying that Chachapoyas were blond, these authors do not quote him directly; instead, they quote remarks attributed to him and others by race scientist Jacques de Mahieu in support of his thesis that Vikings had brought civilization to the Americas. Following up on these claims, anthropologist Inge Schjellerup examined Chachapoya remains and found them consistent with other ancient Peruvians. She found, for example, a universal occurrence of shovel-shaped upper incisors and a near-complete absence of the cusp of Carabelli on upper molars — characteristics consistent with other indigenous peoples and inconsistent with Europeans.

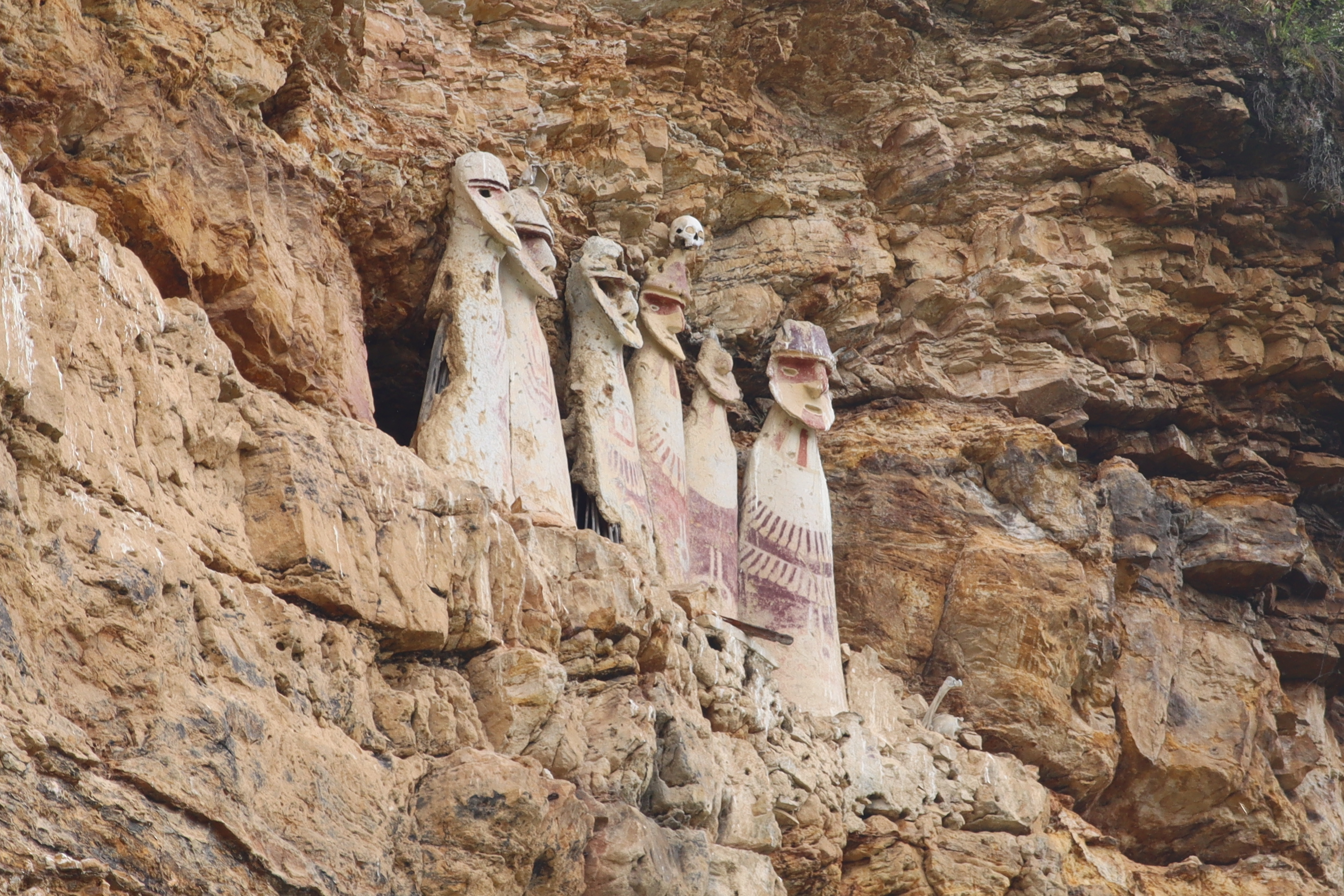
Sarcophagi of Carajía, Chachapoyas culture

According to the analysis of the Chachapoya objects made by the Antisuyo expeditions of the Instituto de Arqueología Amazónica, the Chachapoyas do not exhibit Amazon cultural tradition, but one more closely resembling an Andean one. Given that the terrain facilitates peripatric speciation, as evidenced by the high biodiversity of the Andean region, the physical attributes of the Chachapoyas are most likely reflecting founder effects, assortative mating, and/or related phenomena in an initially small population sharing a relatively recent common ancestor with other indigenous groups.

The anthropomorphous sarcophagi resemble imitations of funeral bundles provided with wooden masks typical of the "Middle Horizon," a dominant culture on the coast and highlands, also known as the Tiwanaku–Wari culture. The "mausoleums" may be modified forms of the chullpa or pucullo, elements of funeral architecture observed throughout the Andes, especially in the Tiwanaku and Wari cultures.

Population expansion into the Amazonian Andes seems to have been driven by the desire to expand agrarian land, as evidenced by extensive terracing throughout the region. The agricultural environments of both the Andes and the coastal region, characterized by its extensive desert areas and limited soil suitable for farming, became insufficient for sustaining a population like the ancestral Peruvians, which had grown for 3000 years.

This theory has been described as "mountainization of the rain forest" for both geographical and cultural reasons: First, after the fall of the tropical forests, the scenery of the Amazonian Andes changed to resemble the barren mountains of the Andes; second, the people who settled there brought their Andean culture with them. This phenomenon, which still occurs today, was repeated in the southern Amazonian Andes during the Inca empire, which projected into the mountainous zone of Vilcabamba, raising examples of Inca architecture such as Machu Picchu.

== Characteristics ==
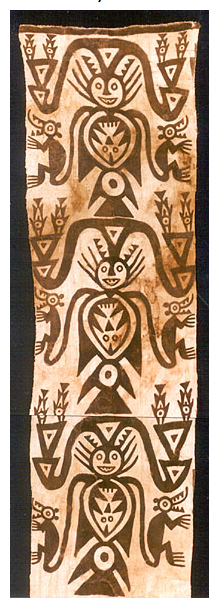
Painted textile, Chachapoyas area, Abisco or Pajaten culture, AD 900–1400

The architectural model of the Chachapoyas is characterized by circular stone constructions, as well as raised platforms constructed on slopes. Their walls were sometimes decorated with symbolic figures. Some structures, such as the monumental fortress of Kuelap and the ruins of Cerro Olán, are prime examples of this architectural style.

Chachapoyan constructions may date to the 9th or 10th century; this architectural tradition still thrived at the time of the Spanish conquest of the Inca Empire until the latter part of the 16th century. To be sure, the Incas introduced their own style after conquering the Chachapoyas, such as in the case of the ruins of Quchapampa in Leimebamba District.

The presence of two funeral patterns is also typical of the Chachapoyas culture. One is represented by sarcophagi, placed vertically and located in caves that were excavated at the highest point of precipices. The other funeral pattern was groups of mausoleums constructed like tiny houses located in caves worked into cliffs.

Chachapoyan handmade ceramics did not reach the technological level of the Moche or Nazca cultures. Their small pitchers are frequently decorated by cordoned motifs. As for textile art, clothes were generally colored in red. A monumental textile from the precincts of Gran Pajatén had been painted with figures of birds. The Chachapoyas also used to paint their walls, as an extant sample in the tunnels of San Antonio in Luya Province reveals. These walls represent stages of a ritual dance of couples holding hands.

The Chachapoyan culture indicated an egalitarian nonhierarchical society through a lack of archaeological evidence and a lack of power expressing architecture that would be expected for societal leaders such as royalty or aristocracy.

== In popular culture ==
In the Indiana Jones franchise, the Golden Idol of the Chachapoyans is the artifact of the opening section seen in the film Raiders of the Lost Ark. Later, Indiana Jones encounters the fictional Hovitos tribe, who are the modern descendants of the Chachapoyan region. While the temple and idol are entirely fictionalized, screenwriter Lawrence Kasdan describes a "Temple of the Chachapoyan Warriors [which is] 2000 years old."

== See also ==
- Amazonas before the Inca Empire
- Extinct languages of the Marañón River basin#Chacha
- Machu Pirqa
- Purum Llaqta, Cheto
