= IAA =

IAA may refer to:

== Businesses and organisations ==
=== International organizations ===
- International Academy of Architecture
- International Academy of Astronautics
- International Actuarial Association
- International Advertising Association
- International Ammunition Association
- International Astrostatistics Association

=== Schools ===
- Idyllwild Arts Academy, in Idyllwild, California, US
- Interlochen Arts Academy of the Interlochen Arts Academy, in Miichigan, US
- Inter-American Academy of Guayaquil, in Ecuador
- International Academy Amman, a school in Jordan

=== Transportation organizations ===
- Indianapolis Airport Authority, in the US
- Irish Aviation Authority
- Israel Airports Authority

=== Other organizations ===
- Academia Sinica Institute of Astronomy and Astrophysics, in Taiwan
- Illinois Agricultural Association, now Illinois Farm Bureau, in the US
- Immigration Appellate Authority, in the UK
- Independent Ambulance Association, in England
- Indian Association of Alberta, in Canada
- Institute for Applied Autonomy, an activist group of anonymous artists
- Information Affairs Authority, in Bahrain
- Instituto Antártico Argentino ('Argentine Antarctic Institute')
- Instituto de Arqueología Amazónica ('Amazon Archaeology Institute'), in Peru
- Instituto de Astrofísica de Andalucía ('Institute of Astrophysics of Andalusia')
- Israel Antiquities Authority
- Israeli Astronomical Association

== Science and technology ==
- Imidazoleacetic acid, a neurotransmitter metabolite
- Indole-3-acetic acid, a plant hormone
- Inflammatory aortic aneurysm, a medical condition
- Interrupted aortic arch, a heart defect
- Iodoacetamide, an alkylating agent for peptide mapping
- Isoamyl alcohol, a common name for 3-Methylbutan-1-ol

== Transportation ==
- Igarka Airport, Russia, IATA code IAA
- Iran Aseman Airlines, an Iranian airline

== Other uses ==
- Interactive Achievement Awards, now D.I.C.E. Awards, in the video game industry
- International Affairs Agency, a fictional entity in Grand Theft Auto V
- International Motor Show Germany, or Internationale Automobil-Ausstellung
- Islamic Army of Aden, or Aden-Abyan Islamic Army, a Sunni Islamist militant group in Yemen
