= EMRTS Cymru =

Emergency Medical Retrieval and Transfer Service Cymru
- Established: 2015; 11 years ago
- Budget: £2.8 million
- Website: emrts.nhs.wales

The Emergency Medical Retrieval and Transfer Service Cymru (EMRTS Cymru) is a pre-hospital critical care service in Wales. It is partnership between Wales Air Ambulance, Welsh Government and NHS Wales.

Helicopter bases in Wales

== History ==
In September 2014 the Welsh Government announced a service that would be capable of reaching around 95% of the population within 30 minutes, operational for 12 hours of the day. Capital funding of almost £2 million was allocated in 2014–15 to set up the service, with almost £3 million a year expected from the following year to support it. In November 2014, up to eight consultant doctors were to be recruited.

In March 2015, the service was set to start within a few weeks using military and civilian personnel travelling in helicopters and four-wheel drive road vehicles. The service was to operate from two bases, located at Swansea in South Wales and Welshpool in Mid-Wales. This was based on the Australian flying doctor model.

In August 2017, the service was extended with a further crew operating from a base at Caernarfon Airport, North Wales.

== See also ==
- Emergency medical services in the United Kingdom
