= NHS Confederation =

Membership body for NHS service providers

The NHS Confederation, formerly the National Association of Health Authorities and Trusts, is a membership body for organisations that commission and provide National Health Service services founded in 1990. The predecessor organisation was called the National Association of Health Authorities in England and Wales.

It has offices in England, Wales (The Welsh NHS Confederation) and Northern Ireland (the Northern Ireland Confederation for Health and Social Care).

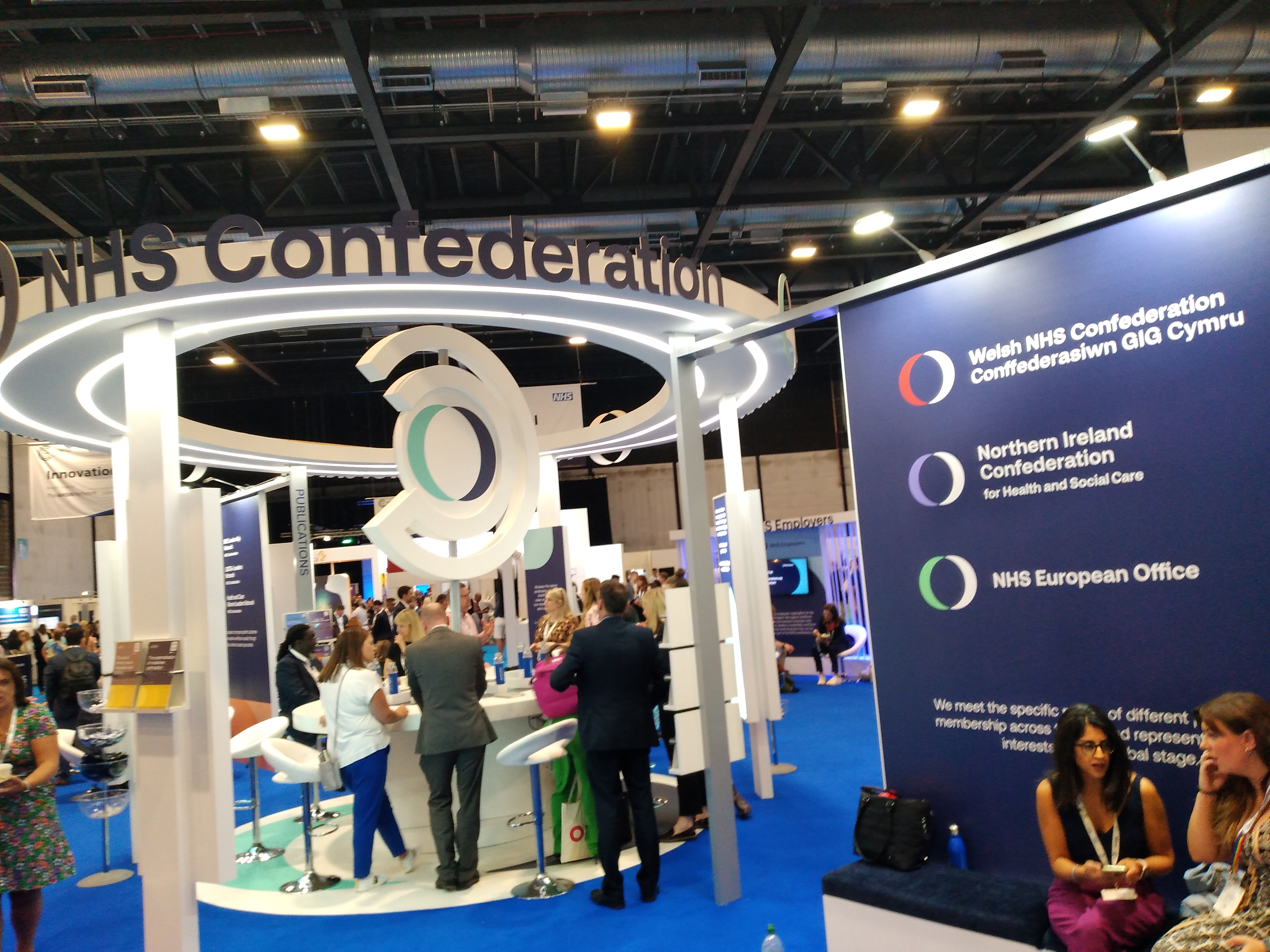
NHS Confederation exhibition

== Leadership ==
Matthew Taylor was appointed as chief executive in 2021. The previous chief executive was Niall Dickson. Stephen Dorrell was the chair until 2019, when Lord Adebowale took over.

== Funding ==
NHS Confederation income is generated via number of different activities. 48% is generated through membership subscriptions; 24% is generated through conferences and events, including sponsorship and exhibitions; and 26% is generated through the reward of grants and contracts. Income is re-invested in the delivery of the NHS Confederation's charitable objectives and in the development and delivery of its member products and services. The NHS Confederation trustees annual report and accounts are published on the Charity Commission's website.

== Membership ==
NHS Confederation membership includes acute trusts, ambulance trusts, community health service providers, foundation trusts, mental health providers, and clinical commissioning groups, and some independent and voluntary sector healthcare organisations that deliver services within the NHS.

It claims to represent the NHS as a whole and has a number of networks to support its members in areas of specific concern to their part of the healthcare system. These include:

- Mental Health Network
- Independent Healthcare Providers Network
- NHS Clinical Commissioners
- National Association of Primary Care
- Association of Ambulance Chief Executives
- Northern Ireland Confederation for Health and Social Care
- Welsh NHS Confederation
- NHS European Office
- NHS Employers organisation
- NHS Race and Health Observatory

NHS Providers, formerly known as the Foundation Trust Network, was a network within the NHS Confederation until it decided to become independent in 2011.

== Operations ==
=== Support functions ===
The NHS Confederation delivers a number of industry-wide support functions for the NHS including:

- the NHS Employers organisation, which represents trusts in England on workforce issues.
- the NHS European Office, which promotes the priorities and interests of the NHS to European institutions, and provides information and advice to NHS trusts on relevant developments in the European Union.

=== Annual conference ===
The NHS Confederation holds an annual conference and exhibition for chairs, chief executives and non-executive directors' senior figures and decision makers from health and social care.

In June 2024 the NHSConfed expo was held in Manchester with a reported 5000 delegates.

=== Publications ===
The NHS Confederation produces regular briefings and reports on key health care issues. It used to produces an annual guide to the NHS called The concise NHS handbook, which was discontinued in 2013.
