= ORCON =

ORCON or Orcon may refer to:

- Orcon Internet Limited, a New Zealand internet service provider
- ORCON, a U.S. intelligence code word used to mark information as "originator controlled"
- Operational Research CONsultancy (ORCON), a UK government initiative to improve ambulance response times
- Project Pigeon, later Project Orcon, a World War II project to use pigeons to control guided missiles
