= Welshpool (disambiguation) =

Welshpool is a town in Wales, UK.

Welshpool or Welsh Pool may also refer to:

== Wales ==
- Welshpool railway station
- Welshpool Airport, aerodrome near Welshpool
- Welshpool Town F.C., a football team

== Australia ==
- Welshpool, Western Australia, a suburb of Perth, Western Australia
  - Welshpool railway station, Perth
  - Welshpool Road
  - Electoral district of Welshpool
- Welshpool, Victoria, a small town in South Gippsland
  - Port Welshpool, Victoria, a small town in South Gippsland

== Elsewhere ==
- Welsh Pool, the former name of Lionville, Pennsylvania, a census-designated place in the US
- Welshpool, a community on Campobello Island in New Brunswick, Canada

== In fiction ==
- Welshpool, a character Deadpool & Wolverine portrayed by Paul Mullin
