= Revash =

Funerary complex in Luya Province, Peru

Coordinates: 6.5407°S 77.8562°W

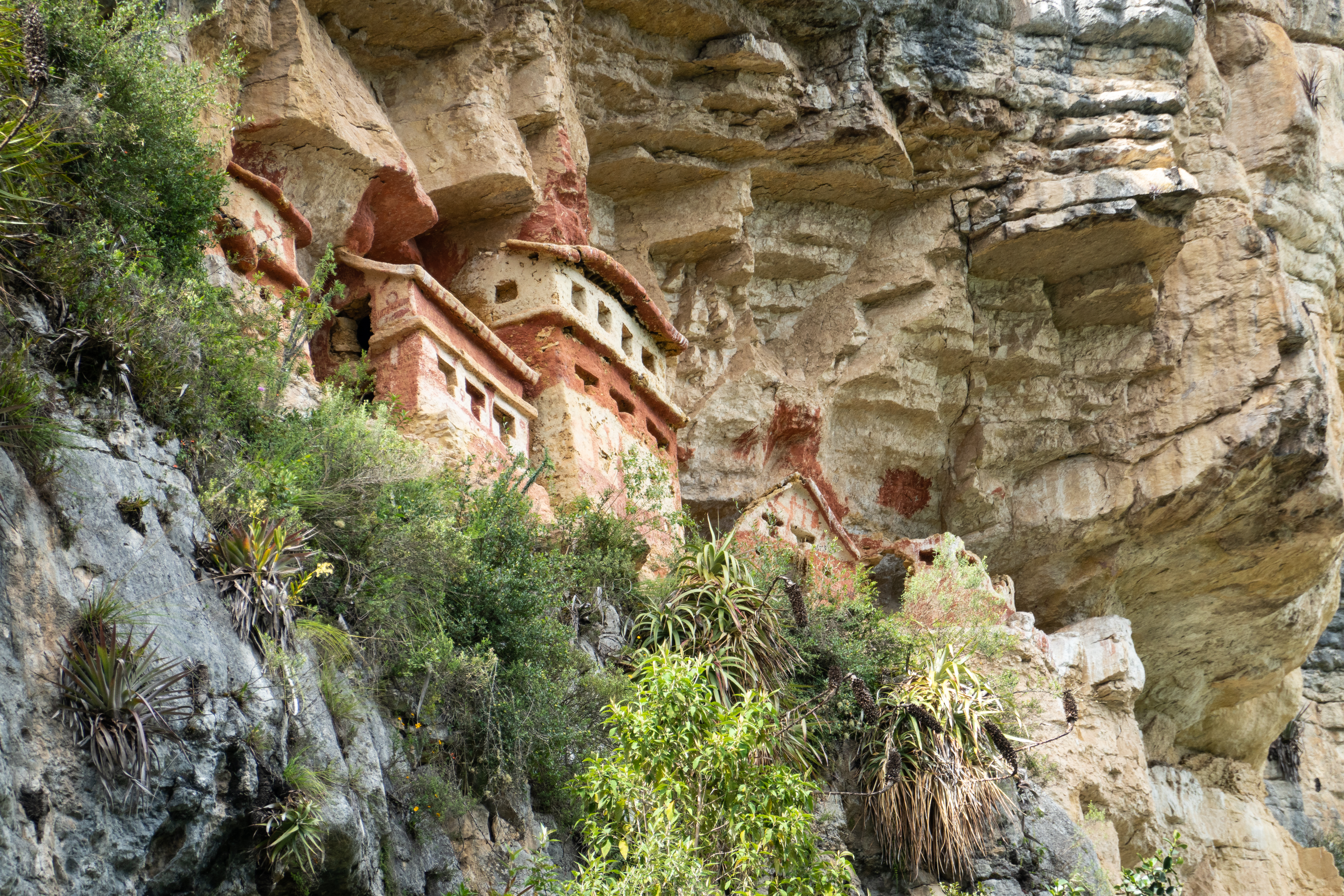

- Location within Peru
- Type: Necropolis
- Periods: Late Intermediate
- Cultures: Chachapoya
- Location: Luya Province, Amazonas

History
- Built: 14th century AD

The Revash funerary complex is located in Peru's Santo Tomás District, part of Luya Province, which is approximately 60 km to the south of Chachapoyas. The funeral buildings are located at an altitude of 2,800 m above sea level. They are within the calcareous rock formation of Cerro Carbón, located in the margin left side of the vale of Alto Utcubamba. The San José de Laumar River serves as the Southeastern border.

== Revash's mausoleums ==
Revash's mausoleums are architectonical rests found in the Amazonas region of Peru. Last century, Charles Wiener discovered the mausoleums of Utcubamba; the mausoleums of Revash in Santo Tomás were studied later by the archaeologists Henry and Paule Reichlen, primarily because the roof of one of the mausoleums had collapsed, covering and protecting the cultural remains.

Between 1983 and 1986, the Antisuyo expeditions of the Amazon Archaeology Institute, identified and thoroughly documented diverse groups of undiscovered mausoleums like the ones in Ochín and many others in the surrounding areas of Revash. Other groups of sarcofagi also exist in La Petaca (Leimebamba); these particular sarcofagi are different from those previously mentioned; they appear in cliffs, like tiny houses stuck to the rock and their walls were not rendered in the same way as the other mausoleums.

Revash's funeral mansions are located in a straight line along the narrow hall that was shaped by the cavity excavated in the rocky wall of the imposing canyon. They remain almost intact except for the mummies located inside, which were destroyed by rodents and pillaged long ago.

The mausoleums resemble small housings and conglomerates. They form miniature "villages".

Revash's funeral houses show a curious similarity with the cliff-houses of Colorado; both mausoleums resemble small housings and conglomerates, form miniature "villages", and were built into stacks. However, these resemblances are only accidental.

Judging by the osseous remains still present in the tombs, Revash's mausoleums were not used individually. For this reason, it is thought that the mausoleums were collective residences, destined to bury the prestigious and powerful.

The sloping roofs are purely symbolic. Because they were protected by the cave, the roofs did not have to withstand rain or sun. For the builders, it was enough to imitate them, constructing them with a mud cake, supporting them with sticks and reeds shaping the quincha form.

The walls of the mausoleums were raised by stones placed on mud mortar. Each has a rectangular floor and one and two floors. Instead of a front door, they have side doors. They are often sideways attached to dividing walls or use a common wall. The back side does not have a wall, since the mausoleums were constructed closer to the rock.

Revash's funeral houses have moldings around the tops of the walls, which are painted with figures, such as felines, South American camelids, people, and two-color circles. They are clearly affiliated to the mausoleums and therefore not necessarily attributable to the preagricultural millennial societies in that area.

The walls of the mausoleums also include art made from incisions in the walls themselves. They are constituted by representations in shape of a T, crosses and rectangles. The symbols in cross are similar in form and execution to those used on the coast architecture of Virú. Their symbolic content is still unknown although the cruciform motives are identical to those of the side walls on the church in La Jalca, which, according to the local tradition, would have been raised by the mythical Juan Oso, or "small bear".

The mausoleums of Chachapoyas do not present Inca cultural influences, but they surface relatively late in Peruvian archeological history.

In 1950, Paule and Henry Reichlen estimated that the mausoleums might date to the 14th century C.E. and that they were connected with the funeral architecture known as chullpa, which was common in ancient Peru during the period Tiahuanaco-Huari (around 1000 C.E.)
