= Association of Ambulance Chief Executives =

Non-statutory organisation in the United Kingdom

The Association of Ambulance Chief Executives is a non-statutory organisation that facilitates the coordination of programmes of work and policies across National Health Service ambulance services trusts in England. It is analogous to the National Police Chiefs' Council for police forces in the United Kingdom.

It advocates closer integration between 999 and 111 services as this allows excess capacity to be utilised to respond to less urgent 999 calls.

In September 2022 the association released figures showing patient handover data. 203,000 patients experienced handover delays exceeding 15 minutes, with 146,000 hours lost to 15 minute+ handover delays, the third highest on record.

== Membership ==
Membership comprises the chief executives of the following ambulance services:

Full members:

- The 10 English ambulance services trusts

Associate members:

- Isle of Wight NHS Trust
- Isle of Man Ambulance Service
- States of Jersey Ambulance Service
- Guernsey Ambulance and Rescue Service
- Gibraltar Health Authority

== See also ==
- Emergency medical services in the United Kingdom
