= Staffordshire Ambulance Service =

Former ambulance trust in Staffordshire, England

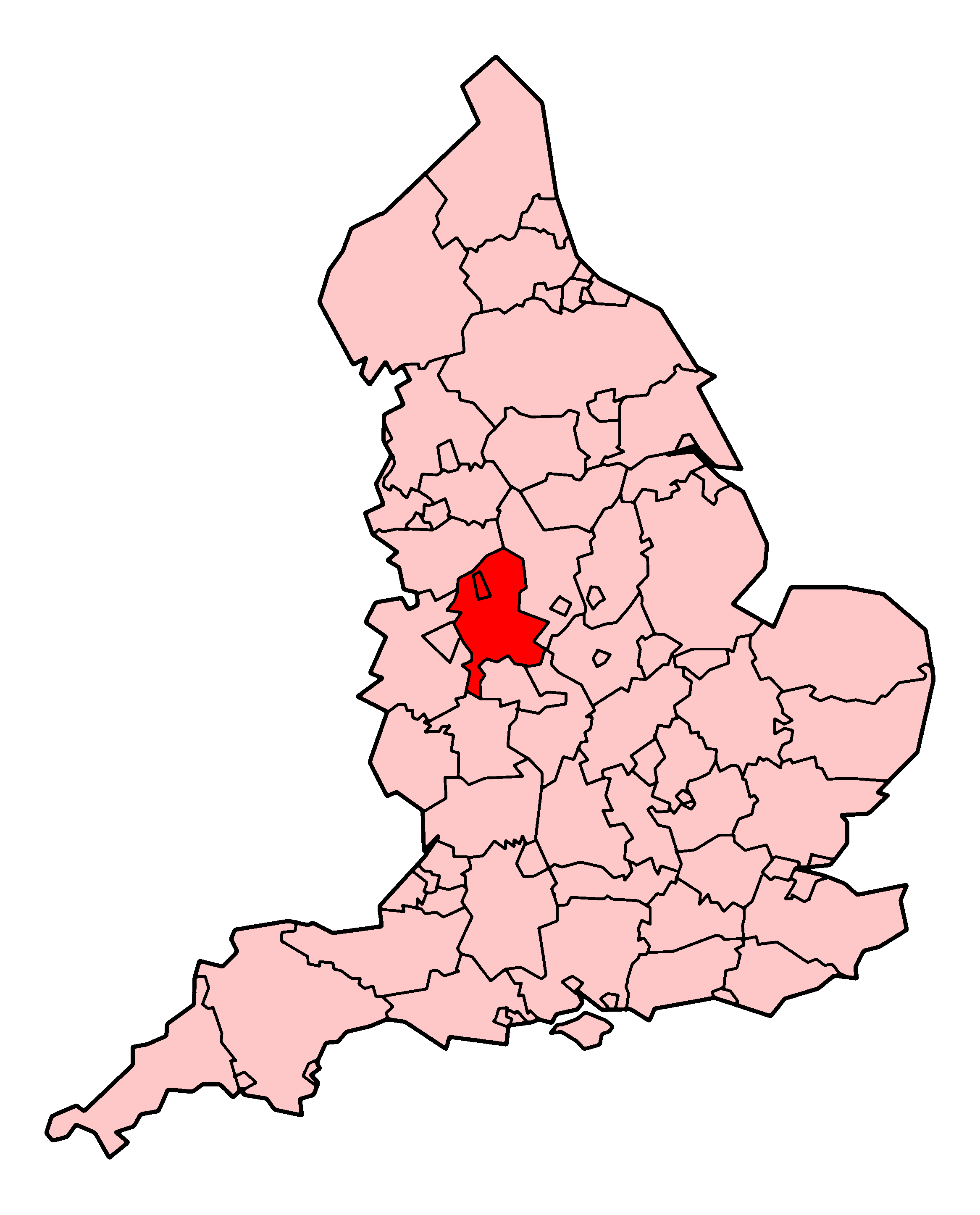
Map of Staffordshire Ambulance Service's coverage

The Staffordshire Ambulance Service NHS Trust was the authority responsible for providing National Health service (NHS) ambulance services in Staffordshire and Stoke-on-Trent in the West Midlands region of England. Staffordshire Ambulance Service was acquired by West Midlands Ambulance Service on 1 October 2007.

== See also ==
- Emergency medical services in the United Kingdom
- List of NHS trusts
