= Laguna de las Momias =

Lake in Chachapoyas Province, Amazonas, Peru

Coordinates: 6.850°S 77.700°W

Laguna de las Momias (Lagoon of the Mummies), also known as Laguna de los Cóndores (Lagoon of the Condors) is an archaeological site located in Leimebamba, Chachapoyas province, in the Amazonas Region of Peru, excavated by the archaeologist Federico Kauffmann Doig. The site is called Lagoon of the Condors because the people who found the lagoon would see these birds soar near the lagoon; it also obtained the name Lagoon of the Mummies because of the mummy findings around the area. The Chachapoyas were an old civilization that was located in the northern forest in the time of 900 a.c. This culture had been unknown by archaeologists for hundreds of years until the mummies appeared.

It contains many mausoleums that occupy a natural cave with difficult access, sculpted in the wall of a craggy rock emerging from a lagoon.

Each funeral deposit contains a mummy in a seated position, wrapped in both flat and decorated textiles. In the Lagoon of the Mummies there were ceramics and other artifacts found tracing back to the Incas. When excavating the Lagoon of the Mummies, there were six mausoleums found, each consisting of cube-shaped enclosures next to each other in a row. The tombs were housed in caves with paintings on the walls related to the mausoleums and containing indecipherable symbols. The enclosures were built with only three walls, the fourth being the rock wall. The enclosures had two floors and a window on the top level. The window's purpose was to recirculate the air to prevent the mummies from being damaged by moisture. The mummies have unique coffins with the design of a human faced stitched on them. Based on the size of the funeral, it appears that they were of small creatures. The mummification process was done with sophisticated techniques in order to preserve the bodies due to high humidity in the Amazon Andes. In the tombs were various cultural objects, such as pottery, textiles, wood carvings the size of statues, clothing, silver, personal ornaments, and even ceremonial objects.

The mausoleums of the Lagoon of the Mummies were replete with funeral deposits, approximately two hundred; high-ranking individuals were buried there. During Inca domination of the region, officials from Cuzco, the Inca capital, resided in Cochabamba. In the 1990s, artifacts were stolen by looters. Although the robbers were later arrested, the end result was that many of these mummies were destroyed and others damaged.

In 1997, a survey of the damage was taken by archaeologist Peter Lerche on the behalf of Peru's National Institute of Culture. There was an initial estimation of around 70 mummies to have been present on the cliff edge (it was later discovered that there was actually over 200 bundles of mummies). Later salvaging revealed that there were others who had damaged the site other than the ones who initially hacked into the tombs and stole artifacts. These were caused by tourists and looters over time visiting the cliff, moving mummies to take pictures as well as taking artifacts as souvenirs. Due to the mummies being moved around, many of them were damaged, with some of them even exposed to the rain, completely decaying them.
