= States of Jersey Ambulance Service =

- Headquarters: States of Jersey Ambulance Station, Rouge Bouillon, Saint-Helier, Jersey JE2 3ZA, Jersey
- Total area (sq. miles): 119.5 km²
- Ambulances: 8
- Fly-cars: 4
- Chief: Peter Gavey
- Responses: 11,159 (in 2021)

The States of Jersey Ambulance Service (SoJAS) is managed by the Justice and Home Affairs department.

In 2022 in order to deal with peaks in demand and unexpected events it changed the way emergency calls were prioritised. Staff shortages were attributed to the cost of living on the island and it was suggested that there could be accommodation provided for the ambulance staff. Calls will be prioritised similarly to practice in NHS ambulance services.

It launched a community first responders scheme in 2022.

== Performance ==
The service was said to be a good organisation with "passionate and caring staff who provide a good quality of care to patients" when reviewed in 2022 but levels of staff were said to be inadequate in terms of meeting current demands. An overspend of around £400,000 was expected by the end of 2022. A lack of core capacity leads more agency staff being used and for staff doing more overtime.

== Structure ==
The SoJAS is structured similarly to most NHS ambulance services.

Paramedics are the primary healthcare professionals within the service and are all required to be registered with the Health and Care Professions Council, like in the UK.

The service also operates an intermediary crew, which has the primary role of providing inter-facility transfers. This is broadly 'take-homes' between Jersey General Hospital and discharged patients' homes but may also involve transport to and from Jersey Airport. Patients may be taken to Jersey Airport where they require specialist care which cannot be provided at Jersey General Hospital and instead will be flown via the Jersey Emergency Transfer Service (JETS) to the UK to a more specialised hospital.

Leading Ambulance Paramedic (LAP) is a hybrid role of office-based and operational work. The LAP will be dispatched by the Combined Control Centre (CCC) to support ambulance crews at challenging or multi-agency scenes in a managerial or clinical capacity. LAPs are also deployable to emergencies where all other paramedic crews are unavailable.

LAPs are supported by a Silver Duty Officer (SDO) who are deployable from office work to major incidents.

== Fleet ==
SoJAS has twenty six vehicles in its fleet.

- 8 emergency ambulances
- 4 rapid response cars
- 1 see and treat vehicle
- 1 intermediary crew ambulance
- 2 major incident vehicles
- 10 Patient Transport Vehicles

The SoJAS also operates patient transport services which use ten minibuses. Front line ambulances are Mercedes Sprinter box-conversions

== Significant events ==
Most notably, the SoJAS responded to the Haut du Mont flat explosion on 10 December 2022 where ten people were killed. In attendance were three front line ambulances, two major incident support vehicles, the duty leading ambulance paramedic and the silver duty officer as well as volunteer ambulance agencies such as St John Ambulance Jersey and the Ambulance Support Unit (ASU).
