= National Association of Primary Care =

British professional organisation

The National Association of Primary Care is a membership association for Primary care professionals in the National Health Service and is the primary care provider network of the NHS Confederation.

Dr Caroline Taylor is the chair of the association. It has offices in London.

Until 1998 it was called the National Association of Commissioning GPs and many of its members were involved with GP Fundholding.

It is involved in the development of plans associated with the Five Year Forward View for bringing GP practices together across populations of up to 50,000 patients in what it calls the 'primary care home'. This is similar to the multispecialty community provider model, but on a smaller scale. This has been implemented in 15 pilot sites during 2016, covering around 500,000 patients. Occupational therapists, mental health therapists, clinical pharmacists and other clinical professionals are given a more prominent role in these organisations. The Nuffield Trust produced a preliminary report on it in August 2017, which was quite positive, but found would need time, money and strong working relationships across the NHS and social care to be effective.

Simon Stevens addressed a meeting of the association in October 2016 to explain plans for capital investment in 300 GP practices using the £900 million Estates and Technology Transformation Fund between 2016 and 2021.
