= Leimebamba District =

Coordinates: 6°40′59″S 77°46′59″W

Leimebamba
- District
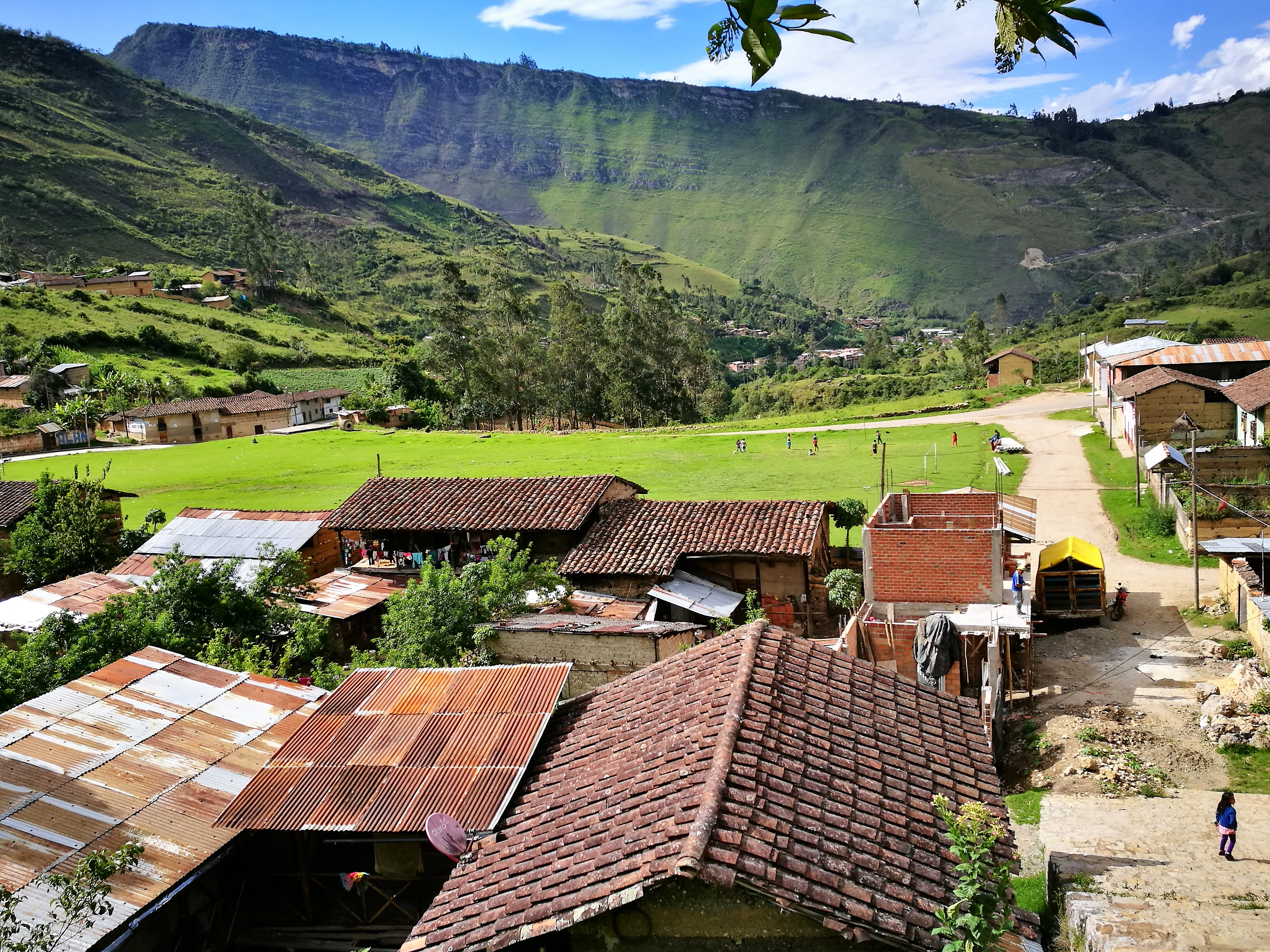
- Football field of Leimebamba from the stairs that rise to the museum
- Interactive map of Leimebamba
- Country: Peru
- Region: Amazonas
- Province: Chachapoyas
- Founded: 3 May 1955
- Capital: Leimebamba

Government
  - Mayor: Laynes Silva Vigo

Area
  - Total: 373.14 km^{2} (144.07 sq mi)
- Elevation: 2,158 m (7,080 ft)

Population (2017)
  - Total: 3,620
  - Density: 9.70/km^{2} (25.1/sq mi)
- Time zone: UTC-5 (PET)
- UBIGEO: 010110

Leimebamba (or Leymebamba) is a district of the province of Chachapoyas, located in the northern Peruvian department of Amazonas, in the valley of the Utcubamba River, about 60 kilometers (37 miles) south of Chachapoyas.

== Geography ==
Leimebamba is at approximately 2,000 meters above sea level, and the area is warm with a lush tropical vegetation. Although it can rain anytime of the year, during June to September the weather tends to be dry.

To the north, the Leimebamba District is bordered by San Francisco del Yeso District and Montevideo District, to the east by San Martín Region, to the south by the District of Chuquibamba; and to the west by the District of Balsas.

Leimebamba is located on a mountain near the River Utcubamba.

=== Villages and hamlets ===
- Palmira
- Leymebamba
- Bonda
- Guilipe
- Muyucsha
- Ishpingo
- Pomacochas
- Cuensol
- Dos De Mayo
- Plaza Pampa
- Chururco
- Lluy
- Llushpe
- Puchicana
- Checo
- Teaben
- Felipa
- Miraflores
- Santa Dionisia
- Gramalote Rural
- Amuch
- Parajillo
- Shalcapata
- Shishuayco
- Potrerillo
- El Salto
- Triguicsa
- El Tambo
- Shonie
- Monticunga
- Siogue
- San Miguel
- Timbo Yambo
- Jinez
- Las Escobas
- Chorrera
- Sinuno
- Lugar Tranquilo
- Quingrimachay
- Ñushta
- Torongil
- Lajas Bamba
- Tambillo
- Shival
- La Vaquería
- Monteseco
- La Joya
- Tajopamba
- Quishuar
- Laguna-Condores
- Churo Churo
- Corral Conga
- Pampas Verdes
- Cabildo Pata
- Atuen
- El Jardín
- Orfedon
- Israel
- Chilingote
- Agua Loca
- Conjul
- Chinchango
- Cashapata

The majority of the villages and hamlets of Leymebamba District are situated in the mountains, some of them are situated near the Utcubamba River.

== History ==
Leimebamba District was legally created on May 3, 1955, during the government of President Manuel A. Odria.

The Incas accompanying Tupac Yupanqui celebrated Inti Raymi in the area, and so named it Raymipampa. From this, the name Leimebamba is derived.

== Festivals ==
Our Lady of Mount Carmel is the patroness saint of Leimebamba town, and a festival in her honour is held on July 16 every year. Celebrations include a special mass, a procession, a festival of local cuisine, street parties and fireworks.

August 28, the Day of Saint Augustine sees another celebration.

== Transport ==
There are two overland approaches to Leimebamba. It is located on the main road between Chachapoyas and Cajamarca, all of which is now paved.

Leimebamba is accessible via an eight-hour bus route from Mayor General FAP Armando Revoredo Iglesias Airport in Cajamarca. The single-lane road passes through Celendín, ascending to a 3,200-meter (10,500 ft) mountain pass before descending to Balsas on the Marañón River at an elevation of 850 meters (2,789 ft). The route then climbs to the Barro Negro pass at 3,678 meters (12,068 ft) before descending to Leimebamba at 2,200 meters (7,218 ft).

It is only 60 km (37 miles) from Chachapoyas to Leimembamba, along the Utcubamba valley, and public transport takes about two hours to make the journey. However, Chachapoyas does not have a commercial airport, with the nearest one being in Jaen, a 4-hour bus journey away.

== Tourist Attractions ==
Leimebamba District is home to a large number of tourist attractions. The best known of these is the Leymebamba Museum, which contains many of the mummies found at the Laguna de los Condores site, along with their funerary offerings. It also has information about the region's flora and fauna, and a display of quipus found in the area.

The spectacular Laguna de los Condores itself can be visited, either by hike or on horseback. There are also many pre-Inca ruins in the region, such as Congona, Petaca and Diablo Wasi, most of which are thought to have belonged to the Chachapoya culture, but have been little studied. Reaching these ruins can be done on foot, with a selection of one-day and multi-day hikes.

The town of Leimebamba has a small selection of accommodation, and can be used as a base to visit other attractions of Amazonas, such as Revash, Kuelap and Gocta Falls.

=== Religious ===
Leimebamba is a head office of a parish that is served by two Priests from the Roman Catholic Diocese of Chachapoyas.

- Archbishop of Chachapoyas: Monseñor Emiliano Amtonio Cisneros Martínez, OAR.
