= Wales Air Ambulance =

Welsh charity air ambulance

Wales Air Ambulance Charitable Trust
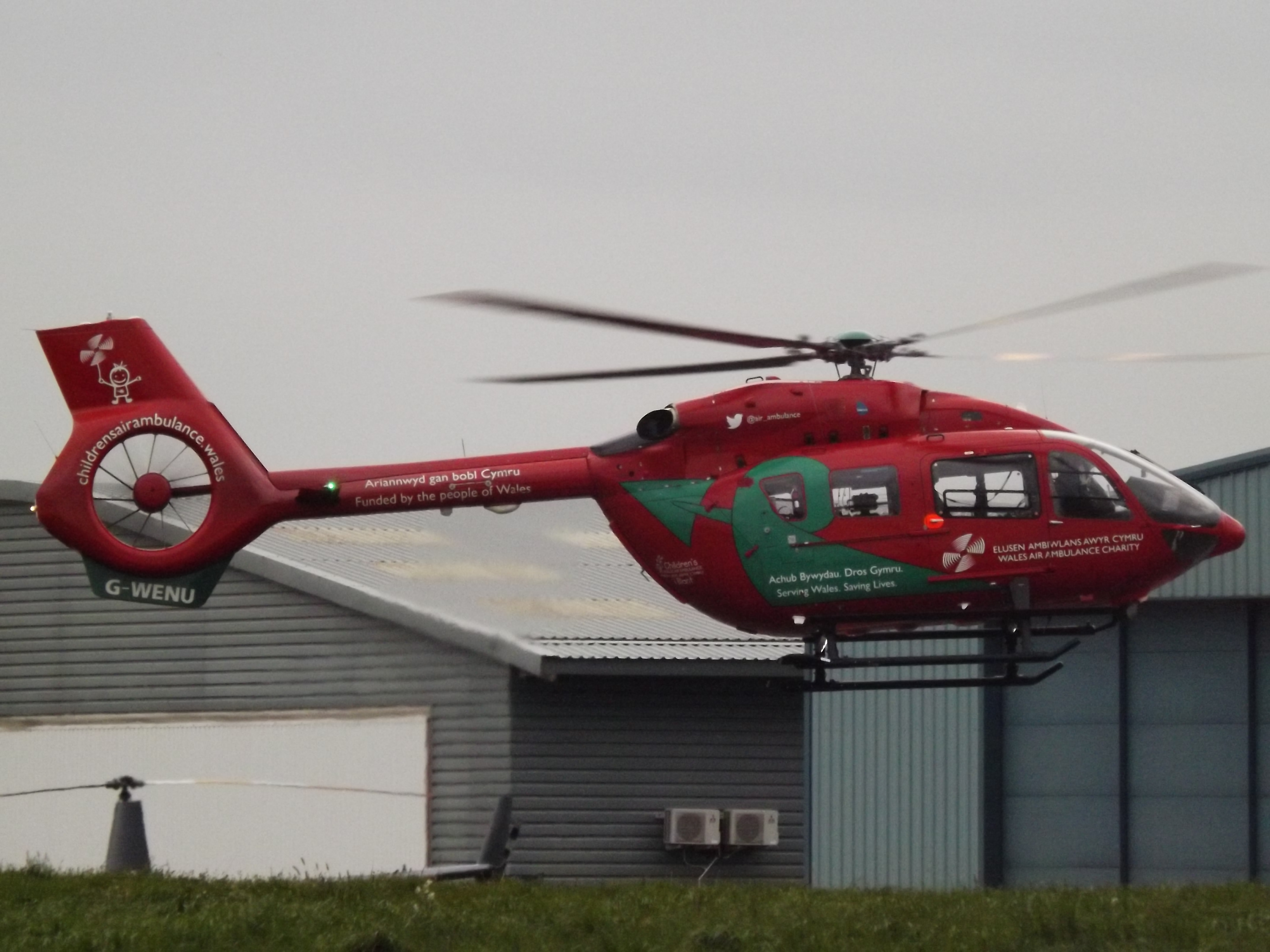
- G-WENU, one of the charity's Airbus H145 aircraft
- Founded: 1 March 2001
- Type: Charitable organisation
- Registration no.: 1083645
- Location: Dafen, Carmarthenshire
- Region served: Wales
- Chief Executive Officer: Dr Sue Barnes
- Patron: William, Prince of Wales
- Aircraft operated: Airbus H145
- Number of aircraft: 4 plus 1 reserve
- Revenue: £16.8 million (2024)
- Employees: 101 (2024)
- Website: www.walesairambulance.com

The Wales Air Ambulance Charitable Trust (Welsh: Ymddiriedolaeth Elusennol Ambiwlans Awyr Cymru), also known as Wales Air Ambulance Charity (WAAC; Welsh: Elusen Ambiwlans Awyr Cymru, EAAC), is a charity air ambulance service providing a free, life-saving helicopter emergency medical service (HEMS) for the critically ill and injured in Wales. It is an independent charity that relies on charitable donations to supply and maintain a fleet of emergency aircraft and rapid response vehicles.

The charity's three operational bases in Wales, plus the base for CWAA

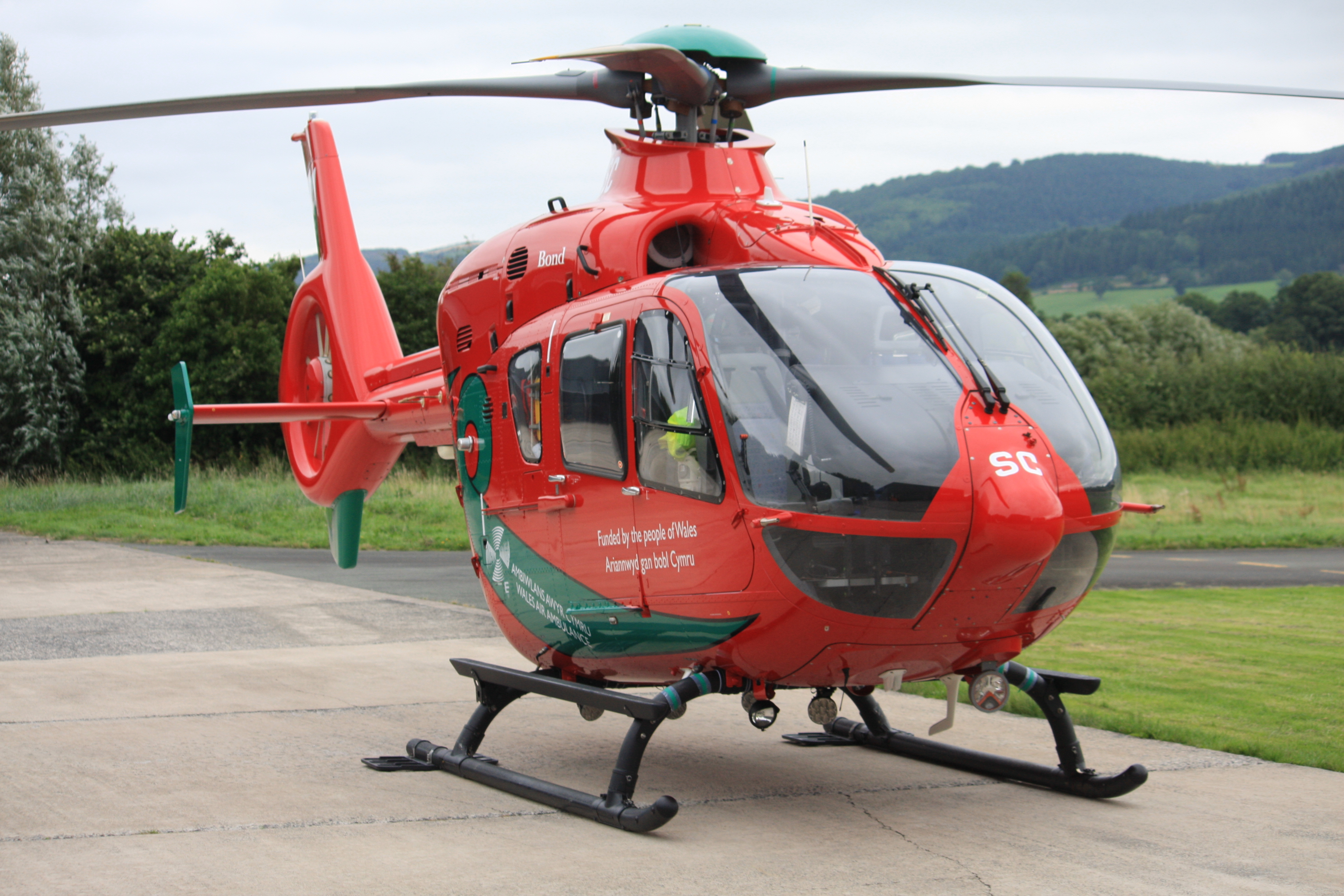
G-WASC, a Eurocopter EC135, was used by the Wales Air Ambulance prior the introduction of the H145 aircraft, but has since returned to be used as the Children's Wales Air Ambulance.

== Service ==
WAAC has four helicopters and medical crews stationed at Caernarfon Airport, Welshpool Airport, Cardiff Heliport, and Dafen (near Llanelli). The teams are capable of reaching a critically ill patient anywhere in Wales, from any base. Each helicopter team consists of a pilot and two medics, typically a doctor and critical care practitioner, or two critical care practitioners.

At present the aircraft operate (weather dependent) seven days a week from 08:00 to 20:00 at Caernarfon and Welshpool, 07:00–19:00 at Llanelli, 07:00–19:00 at Cardiff Heliport, and 19:00–07:00 at Cardiff Heliport to ensure that there is 24-hour emergency cover across the whole of Wales.

The air ambulance service in Wales is delivered via a Third Sector and Public Sector partnership. The Wales Air Ambulance Charity needs to raise funds every year to supply and maintain the aircraft and rapid response vehicle fleets. The consultants and critical care practitioners who work for the service are supplied by EMRTS Cymru, a part of NHS Wales. Pilots are provided by specialist emergency services helicopter company Gama Aviation. The specialist medical teams can provide a range of critical care interventions, previously only found in hospitals, at the roadside, reducing the time taken for lifesaving care to take place. This includes giving a general anaesthetic to patients, providing sedation for painful procedures and undertaking critical surgical procedures. All vehicle platforms carry a range of equipment to facilitate this including monitoring, high level portable ventilator and specialist transfer equipment. More recently, the service has commenced carrying blood products. This includes red blood cells for transfusion to bleeding patients, as well as freeze-dried plasma and fibrinogen to help with clotting and monitors and drugs to help reverse bleeding in patients who are on blood thinning medicine (warfarin) in an emergency situation.

In the year ending 31 July 2024, the charity had an income of £16.8 million, including £152,000 from government grants. Expenditure was £17.4M, of which £11M (63%) was spent on delivering the charitable service. The remaining £6.4M was spent on fundraising and governance.

== Fleet ==
The charity operate a fleet of four Airbus H145 helicopters plus one reserve. Llanelli-based aircraft (G-WENU) has call sign Helimed 57, Welshpool (G-WOBR) is Helimed 59, while the Caernarfon-based aircraft (G-WROL) has call sign Helimed 61. These are joined by G-WYDN and G-LOYW

All helicopters are owned by Gama Aviation, who also provide the pilots, base engineers and maintenance for the aircraft.

In addition to the four aircraft, the charity has a fleet of rapid response vehicles (RRV), spread across its four bases. These vehicles, fitted with full audio and visual warning systems, carry the same standard equipment as the aircraft, and are utilised if the aircraft is offline, for example due to weather conditions, or as an additional responding resource.

== See also ==
- Air ambulances in the United Kingdom
