= St John Ambulance Jersey =

First aid organisation based in Jersey

Coordinates: 49°11′31″N 2°06′17″W

St John Ambulance
- Logo of St John Ambulance Jersey
- Abbreviation: SJAJ
- Founded: circa 1869
- Type: Non-governmental, charitable voluntary organisation
- Registration no.: AJC76
- Location: 14-16 Midvale Road, Jersey, JE2 3YR
- Origins: St John Ambulance
- Services: Community service; Emergency medical services
- Key people: Sarah Harman, CEO
- Website: www.stjohnambulancejersey.com

St John Ambulance Jersey, officially the Commandery of the Bailiwick of Jersey of the Most Venerable Order of the Hospital of St John of Jerusalem is a charitable voluntary first aid organisation based in Jersey. It teaches first aid and communication skills to over 16s, alongside recruiting volunteers to provide first aid at events, respond to emergencies and work alongside police. On the 3 April 2020, the Jersey Ambulance Service took command of St John Ambulance, to help coordinate its emergency first aid efforts. The organisation is affiliated with St John Ambulance England, and is heavily managed from their headquarters. In 2019, the charity faced financial troubles after failing to find a sponsor. The chief executive, Barry Marsden, said the organisation could face bankruptcy in 2021. Following the statement, David Le Quesne sponsored the charity and brought its finances to £900,000.
