= Independent Ambulance Association =

English health organization

- Abbreviation: IAA
- Type: Non-profit representative body
- Region served: England
- Website: www.iaauk.org

The Independent Ambulance Association or IAA is the non-profit body representing ambulance services regulated by the Care Quality Commission in England, but not part of the statutory National Health Service provision, who are represented by the Association of Ambulance Chief Executives.

== Objectives ==
The organisation exists to act as a single voice on policy which affects independent operators of ambulance services, including working on areas such as procurement, training and consistency between services.

== History ==
The organisation formally launched in January 2012, with directors from leading independent ambulance providers, and an independent non-executive director.
