= St John Ambulance Guernsey =

British first aid organisation

- St John Guernsey logo
- Website: stjohn.gg

St John Ambulance Guernsey (SJAG), also known as St John Guernsey (SJG), officially The Commandery of the Bailiwick of Guernsey of the Most venerable Order of the Hospital of St John of Jerusalem is a charitable voluntary first aid organisation and the division of St John Ambulance in Guernsey. It provides event first aid cover, cycle response unit, the Community Library, and a Badgers and Cadets youth programme. St John also provides Community First Responders, the Volunteer Ambulance Reserve and the Flying Christine III marine ambulance in partnership with St John Ambulance & Rescue Service (SJARS). St John Training Services delivers workplace and community first aid sessions and runs a First Aid in Schools programme.
