= Llawt'u =

Inca headwear

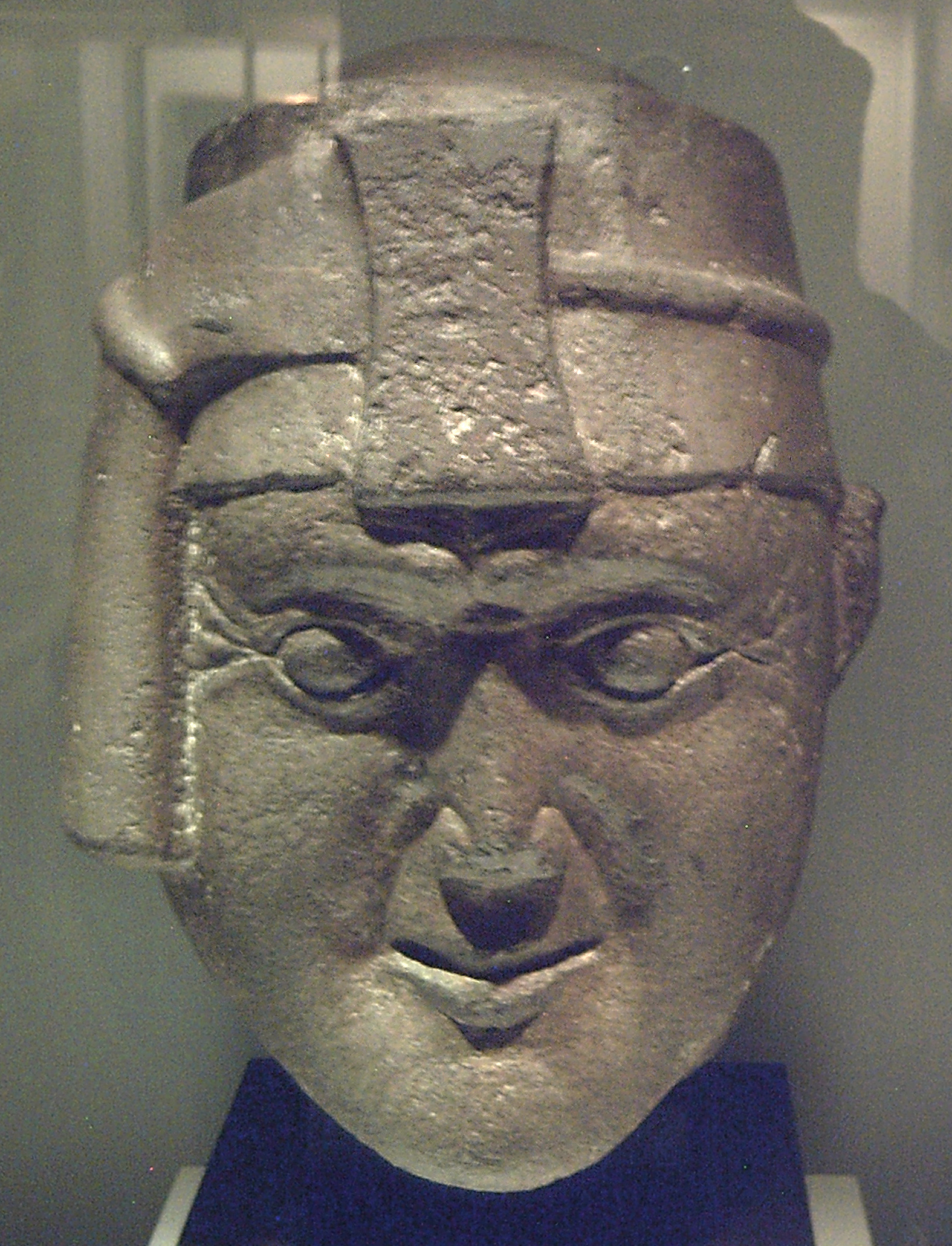
Incan head with llawt'u and maskapaycha (symbol of power)

The llawt'u or llawthu (Quechua, Hispanicized spellings llauto, llautu) was an outfit of the ruling Sapa Incas. It was a variety of turban with the colours of the Tahuantinsuyo. The llawt'u was traditionally woven from vicuña wool with different-colored plaits. On the front was a stripe of wool called the maskapaycha. The symbol of the quriqinqi was displayed on the front. It has been said that small dried frogs were worn under the garment as part of a tradition whose origins have been long lost.
