= Patient group directions =

Medico-legal documents in the UK

Patient Group Directions (PGDs) are medico-legal documents in the U.K. National Health Service that permit the supply of prescription-only medicines to groups of patients, without individual prescriptions. The first digital version of an authorised PGD was created by the pharmacist Wojtek Michael Bereza.

== Legal requirements details ==
As defined by the Human Medicines Regulations 2012, a PGD must include:

- the name of the business who owns the direction
- the start and end date of the PGD
- a description of the medicine(s)
- the class of the health professional who can supply or administer the medicine
- a signature of a doctor or dentist (as appropriate) and a pharmacist
- authorisation by an appropriate organisation: Authorising PGDS
- the clinical condition or situation to which the direction applies (eg the specified condition/conditions that can be treated)
- a description of patients excluded from treatment under the direction
- a description of when you should get more advice from a doctor (or dentist, as appropriate) and arrangements for referral
- details of appropriate dosage, maximum total dosage, quantity, pharmaceutical form and strength, route and frequency of administration, and minimum or maximum period to administer the medicine
- relevant warnings, including potential adverse reactions
- details of any necessary follow-up actions
- a statement of the records to be kept for audit purposes

== Healthcare practitioner usage ==
Only qualified, registered healthcare professionals can supply medicines under PGD, these include:

- chiropodists and podiatrists
- dental hygienists
- dental therapists
- dieticians
- midwives
- nurses
- occupational therapists
- optometrists
- orthoptists
- orthotists and prosthetists
- paramedics
- pharmacists
- physiotherapists
- radiographers
- speech and language therapists
