= Welshpool Airport =

Welshpool Airport Mid Wales Airport
- IATA: none; ICAO: EGCW

Summary
- Airport type: Public (licensed)
- Owner: Linda Jones
- Operator: Mid Wales Airport Ltd
- Serves: Mid Wales & Shropshire
- Location: Welshpool, Wales, UK
- Elevation AMSL: 233 ft (71 m)
- Coordinates: 52°37′46″N 003°09′09″W
- Website: www.welshpoolairport.co.uk

Map
- Location in Powys

Runways
Direction	Length		Surface
Direction	m	ft	Surface
04/22	1,020	3,346	Asphalt
- Sources: UK AIP at NATS

Welshpool Airport (ICAO: EGCW) (also known as Mid-Wales Airport) is located 2 NM (3.7 km; 2.3 mi) south of Welshpool, Powys, Wales.

It has a CAA Ordinary Licence (Number P865) that allows flights for the public transport of passengers or for flying instruction as authorised by the licensee (Mid Wales Airport Limited). The aerodrome is licensed for night use. The airport is open to the public, with pleasure flights and flying lessons available.

Welshpool airport is one of the bases used by the Wales Air Ambulance.

== History ==
Welshpool airport was founded by Bob Jones near the farm he owned. It began operations as a grass strip in 1990 and eventually expanded into a civil aviation aerodrome.
