= NHS ambulance services =

Emergency medical services in the United Kingdom

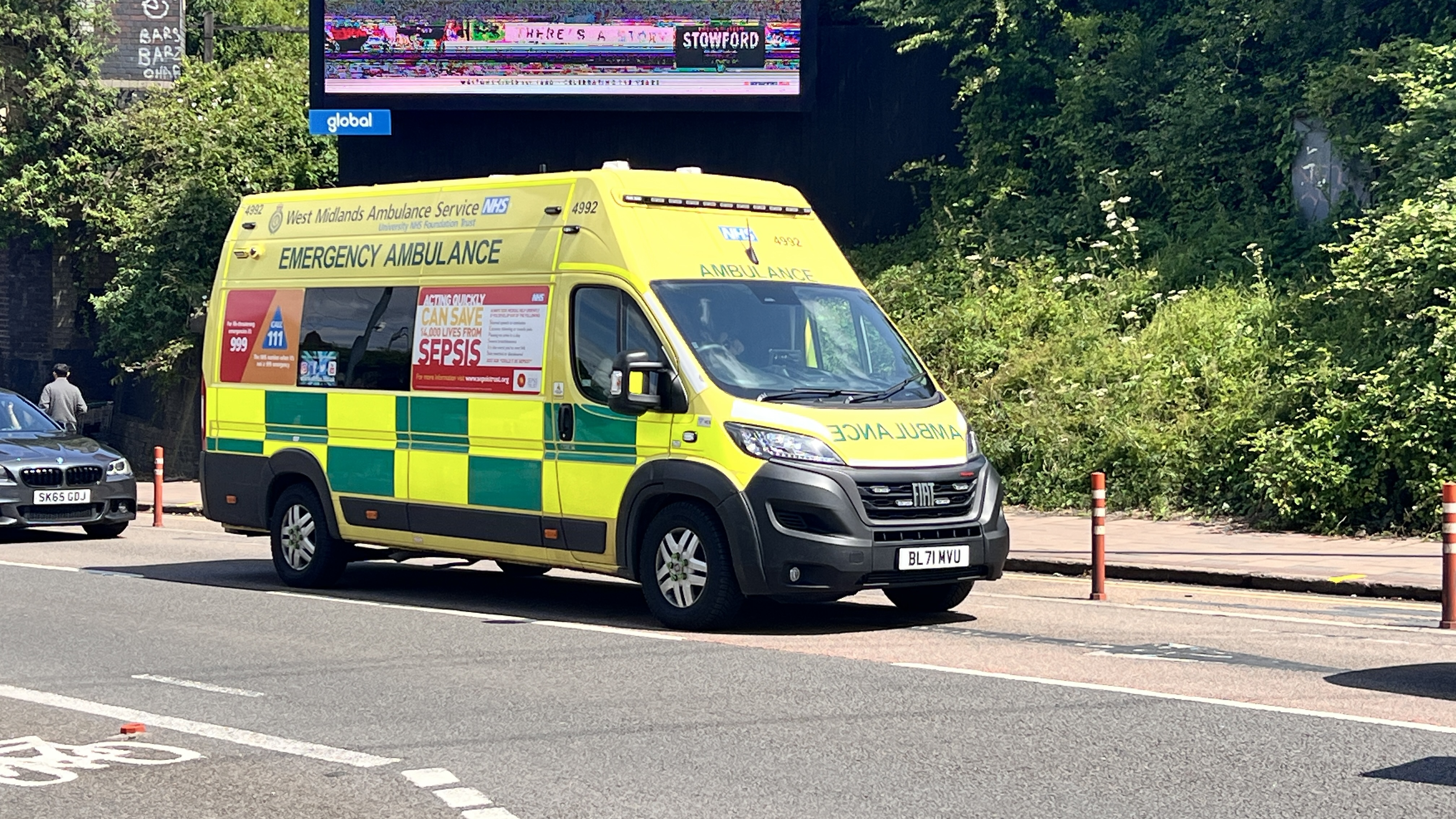
- West Midlands NHS Ambulance

In the United Kingdom, National Health Service ambulance services provide free at the point of use emergency medical care to any person requiring treatment, regardless of immigration or visitor status. These services are provided by National Health Services of England, Scotland, Wales and Northern Ireland. The current system comprises 14 NHS organisations: 11 ambulance services trusts cover the separate regions of England and; individual nationwide services cover Scotland, Wales and Northern Ireland respectively.

NHS ambulance services are classed as an essential service, the public normally access emergency medical services through one of the valid emergency telephone numbers (either 999 or 112). Additionally, some ambulance services are considering trialing a 999 video calling service, in order to be able to visually assess patients whilst crews are en route.

The work of ambulance services included responsibility for patient transport, but in England this is now often covered by separate contractual arrangements, and often delivered by private providers.

== History ==
The National Health Service Act 1946 gave county (and county borough) councils in England and Wales a statutory responsibility to provide an emergency ambulance service, although they could contract a voluntary ambulance service to provide this.

In 1977/78 ambulance services in the UK cost about £138m. At that time about 90% of the work was transporting patients to and from hospitals.

The Regional Ambulance Officers' Committee reported in 1979 that:

There was considerable local variation in the quality of the service provided, particularly in relation to vehicles, staff and equipment. Most Services were administered by Local Authorities through their Medical Officer of Health and his Ambulance Officer, a few were under the aegis of the Fire Service, whilst others relied upon agency methods for the provision of part or all of their services.

The 142 existing ambulance services in England and Wales were transferred by the National Health Service Reorganisation Act 1973 from local authority to central government control in 1974, and consolidated into 53 services under regional or area health authorities.

In Northern Ireland the service was the responsibility of the Northern Ireland Hospitals Authority before 1974, and was then transferred to the four health and social services boards.

Under the provisions of the National Health Service and Community Care Act 1990 England was covered by 31 ambulance trusts, which were structured as below. In July 2006 the number of ambulance service trusts was reduced to thirteen.

Following consultation, on 1 July 2006 the number of ambulance trusts fell from 29 to 13. The reduction can be seen as part of a trend dating back to 1974, when English local authorities ceased to be providers of ambulance services. This round of reductions in the number of trusts originated in the June 2005 report "Taking healthcare to the Patient", authored by Peter Bradley, Chief Executive of the London Ambulance Service, for the Department of Health. Most of the trusts followed government office regional boundaries. Exceptions included Staffordshire Ambulance Service (which had a temporary reprieve), the Isle of Wight (where provision remained with the island's primary care trust), South East Coast Ambulance Service, and South Central Ambulance Service. There have been two ambulance services trust mergers since 2006.

Since 2013, the 11 ambulance trusts in England and Wales have been:

Trust	Area(s)	2006	2007	2013	Notes
East Midlands Ambulance Service	Nottinghamshire, Derbyshire, Leicestershire, Lincolnshire, Northamptonshire, and Rutland	●	●	●	
East of England Ambulance Service	Bedfordshire, Cambridgeshire, Essex, Hertfordshire, Norfolk, and Suffolk	●	●	●	
Great Western Ambulance Service	Bath and North East Somerset, Bristol, Gloucestershire, North Somerset, Swindon and Wiltshire before merger	●	○	○	Merged into South Western Ambulance Service on 1 February 2013
London Ambulance Service	Greater London and the City of London	●	●	●	
North East Ambulance Service	County Durham, Northumberland, Tyne and Wear, and the area of the former county of Cleveland in North Yorkshire	●	●	●	
North West Ambulance Service	Cheshire, Cumbria, Greater Manchester, Lancashire, and Merseyside	●	●	●	
South Central Ambulance Service	Berkshire, Buckinghamshire, Hampshire (excluding NE) and Oxfordshire	●	●	●	
South East Coast Ambulance Service	Kent, East Sussex, West Sussex, Surrey, and North East Hampshire	●	●	●	
South Western Ambulance Service	Bristol, Cornwall, Devon, Dorset, Gloucestershire, Somerset, and Wiltshire	●	●	●	
Staffordshire Ambulance Service	Staffordshire and Stoke-on-Trent before merger	●	●	○	Merged into West Midlands Ambulance Service on 1 October 2007
West Midlands Ambulance Service	Herefordshire, Shropshire, Staffordshire, Warwickshire, West Midlands, and Worcestershire	●	●	●	
Yorkshire Ambulance Service	East Riding of Yorkshire, North Yorkshire, South Yorkshire, and West Yorkshire	●	●	●	
Welsh Ambulance Service	Wales	●	●	●	

In addition, the Isle of Wight NHS Trust, provides ambulance services for the Isle of Wight.

== Current ambulance services ==
There are currently 14 NHS organisations (ambulance services trusts in England) which provide ambulance services across the UK, which are listed below:

Ambulance service	Region served	Population served	Established
England
East Midlands	Derbyshire, Leicestershire, Rutland, Lincolnshire (including North and North East Lincolnshire), Northamptonshire and Nottinghamshire	4.8 million	1999
East of England	Norfolk, Bedfordshire, Cambridgeshire, Essex, Hertfordshire and Suffolk	5.8 million	1 July 2006
Isle of Wight	Isle of Wight	139,800	April 2012
London	Greater London and City of London	8.6 million	1965
North East	Northumberland, Tyne and Wear, County Durham and Cleveland	2.6 million	1 July 2006
North West	Greater Manchester, Cheshire, Merseyside, Cumbria and Lancashire	7.1 million	1 July 2006
South Central	Berkshire, Buckinghamshire, Hampshire and Oxfordshire	4 million	1 July 2006
South East Coast	East Sussex, West Sussex, Kent, Surrey, and North Eastern Hampshire (Rushmoor and eastern parts of Hart)	4.75 million	1 July 2006
South Western	Bristol, Bath and North East Somerset, Cornwall, Devon, Dorset, Gloucestershire, North Somerset, the Isles of Scilly, Somerset, South Gloucestershire and Wiltshire	5.47 million	1 July 2006
West Midlands	Shropshire, Herefordshire, Worcestershire, Staffordshire, Warwickshire, Coventry, Birmingham and Black Country	5.6 million	1 July 2006
Yorkshire	East Riding of Yorkshire, North Yorkshire, South Yorkshire and West Yorkshire	5 million	1 July 2006
Northern Ireland
Northern Ireland	Antrim, Armagh, Down, Fermanagh, Londonderry, Tyrone	1.8 million	1 April 1995
Scotland
Scotland	East Ayrshire, North Ayrshire, South Ayrshire, Scottish Borders, Dumfries and Galloway, Fife, Clackmannanshire, Falkirk, Stirling, Aberdeenshire, Aberdeen City, Moray, Glasgow City, East Dunbartonshire, East Renfrewshire, Inverclyde, Renfrewshire, West Dunbartonshire, Argyll and Bute, Highland, North Lanarkshire, South Lanarkshire, City of Edinburgh, East Lothian, Midlothian, West Lothian, Orkney Islands, Shetland Islands, Angus, Dundee City, Perth and Kinross and Outer Hebrides	over 5 million	1 April 1995
Wales
Wales	Blaenau Gwent, Bridgend, Caerphilly, Cardiff, Carmarthenshire, Ceredigion, Conwy, Denbighshire, Flintshire, Gwynedd, Isle of Anglesey, Merthyr Tydfil, Monmouthshire, Neath Port Talbot, Newport, Pembrokeshire, Powys, Rhondda Cynon Taf, Swansea, Torfaen, Vale of Glamorgan, Wrexham	around 3.1 million	1 April 1998

== England ==
=== Subcontracting ===
In 2019 the Care Quality Commission reported that ambulance services were relying on private providers because of lack of capacity. Some firms had failed to obtain references or carry out criminal record checks and a lack of staff training was leading to serious patient harm. More than £92 million was spent in 2018/9 on private ambulances and taxis.

In May 2022 NHS England tendered a contract worth up to £30m for “auxiliary ambulance services”. This is worth £7.5m annually and is initially an eight-month contract. It covers both emergency and non-emergency ambulance crews “with the capacity to respond to callouts across categories one to four”. From then, services as the national ambulance auxiliary was provided by St John Ambulance until the termination of the contract in April 2025, a year ahead of its expected end.

=== Targets ===
NHS England sets targets for response times to 999 calls, which were first established in the 1970s. Call handlers were, until 2017, given just 60 seconds to decide on the urgency of the call. The clock stopped once a vehicle reached the patient - even if it was not the appropriate vehicle.

Category A (Red 1 and Red 2) were classed as life-threatening and the national standard sets out that a vehicle should reach the scene within eight minutes for 75% of these calls. Red 1 calls are for patients who have suffered cardiac arrest or stopped breathing and require two vehicles. If onward transport is required a suitable vehicle should arrive on the scene within 19 minutes. The number of these rose from 2.5 million in 2011/12 to just under 3.4 million in 2015/16, but response times fell steadily and the 75% target was not met after 2013. Green 1 required a vehicle within 20 minutes, Green 2 within 30 minutes. Green 3 required telephone assessment within 20 minutes and Green 4 telephone assessment within 60 minutes. These targets are only recommended.

In July 2017 a new set of performance targets for the ambulance service were announced after a trial across four different ambulance trusts, looking at more than 1 million patients overseen by Sheffield University. These are to apply to all 999 calls for the first time. Call handlers will be given four minutes to assess the urgency of the call before the clock starts. The target for the most seriously ill patients is now seven minutes. The 'clock' stops when the most appropriate response, not necessarily the first, arrives. There are condition-specific measures which will track time from 999 call to hospital treatment for heart attacks and strokes. 90% of eligible heart attack patients should receive definitive treatment (balloon inflation during angioplasty at a specialist heart attack centre) within 150 minutes by 2022. 90% of stroke patients should also receive appropriate management (thrombolysis for those who require it, and first CT scan for all other stroke patients) within 180 minutes of making a 999 call. For other emergencies the target is for 90% to be seen in 40 minutes. Urgent or non-urgent calls should expect an average response time of 120 and 180 minutes respectively. Extensive trials have shown that fewer patients are classed as life-threatening and fewer vehicles are dispatched, but responses for the most urgent calls improved.

Trusts asked for more resources to meet these targets, in particular the standards for the top 90% of responses. Taking patients to the "right" hospital rather than the nearest, leads to longer journeys. They were supported by a benchmarking exercise undertaken by the National Audit Office.

In July 2018 eight of the ten services in England missed the seven-minute target. A review conducted by Lord Carter of Coles found that the rate of sickness of ambulance staff was the highest in the NHS - 20 days per person. Use of information technology was advancing very slowly. 25% of ambulances, of which there were 32 different types, were more than seven years old. There were large differences in costs and performance between the different trusts, some of which were attributable to local geography and the performance of other parts of the NHS. Responses to the most urgent calls averaged 11 minutes in rural areas in 2018 but 7 minutes in urban areas. The worst waits were around Wells-next-the-Sea.

The COVID-19 pandemic in England put huge pressure on ambulance services. In July 2021 there were 81,685 category one incidents, up 32% in July 2019, and up 16% on the previous high in December 2019. Response time performance for these calls slumped to 8 minutes 33s, against a target of 7 minutes, with a tenth taking more than 15 minutes 15s. Average response time for category two calls, still classified as emergencies and including heart attacks and strokes, was 41 minutes 4s against a target of 18 minutes. In October 2021 there were around 28,900 ambulance handovers lasting longer than an hour. This was almost four times the 7,772 hour-long handovers recorded in October 2020. In April one patient waited 24 hours in an ambulance - thought to be the longest ever recorded. 11,000 patients waited more than three hours for handover, with 7,000 of them taking more than four hours and 4,000 over five hours.

11 July 2022 was said to be the worst night on record for ambulance services in England, with more than half of some trusts ambulance crews queued outside hospitals in very hot weather. There were more than 85,000 category one ambulance callouts in July - the highest ever recorded. Category one performance averaged 9 minutes 35 seconds, the same as in March 2022 and the joint lowest on record. Category two calls took an average of 59 minutes 7 seconds.

== Funding and activity ==
Between 2011-12 and 2015-16 ambulance activity in England rose by 30%. Funding only increased by 16%. In May 2018 several trusts told commissioners that they needed to spend many millions on extra staff and ambulances if they were to meet the response time targets.

== Information technology ==
In November 2018 NHS Digital launched the National Record Locator Service which gives ambulance staff access to patient records of mental health trusts, initially for the North West, North East, Yorkshire and London Ambulance Services. It is planned to roll it out across England and to include other records.

== See also ==
- BASICS Scotland
- Category:NHS trusts
- Hazardous area response team
