= Operational Research CONsultancy =

ORCON (Operational Research CONsultancy) was developed by a UK consultancy company in 1974 as a standard for monitoring ambulance service performance.

The standard was later adopted internationally by a number of different countries including the Australian ambulance service.

ORCON standards are monitored through key performance indicators.

- Activation - All calls should have an ambulance 'activated' within 3 minutes of the phone being answered. This is usually made up of the control room tasking the crew within one minute, and the crew having a further 2 minutes to be 'on the road'. This is supposed to be achieved with 95% of calls.
- Category A calls, which are calls designated by AMPDS as being immediately life-threatening. 75% of calls should receive an initial response within eight minutes (of the operator answering the call) and 95% of calls should receive an initial response within 19 minutes. The performance indicator generated by the ambulance service is expressed as a percentage of how many calls meet this.
- Category B are calls which are designated by AMPDS as being serious, but not immediately life-threatening. 95% of calls should receive an initial response within 19 minutes. The performance indicator generated by the ambulance service is expressed as a percentage of how many calls meet this.

The distinction between standards in urban and rural services ceased on 1 April 2006. Previously 95% of incidents had to be responded to within 14 minutes in urban services or 19 minutes in rural services. All services are now subject to the same response time requirements of 19 minutes.

== See also ==
- Ambulance
- Advanced Medical Priority Dispatch System
