= Instituto de Arqueología Amazónica =

Archaeological research institute in Peru

The Instituto de Arqueología Amazónica (IAA, 'Amazon Archaeology Institute') is a non-profit research center organisation affiliated to the National Institute of Culture of Peru.

The present director is Dr. Federico Kauffmann Doig, and is operated in combination with the Center Studi Ricerche Ligabue (Italy), whose director is the anthropologist and paleontologist Dr . Giancarlo Ligabue,

These centers have the purpose of investigating the history behind the Amazonian Peruvian Andes.
