= St John Ambulance Cadets =

St John Ambulance Cadets may refer to:

- St John Ambulance Cadets (England) – The youth division of St John Ambulance in England
- St John Ambulance Australia Cadets – The youth division of St John Ambulance in Australia
- St John Youth New Zealand – The youth division of St John Ambulance in New Zealand.
