= St John Ambulance (England) =

First aid organisation based in England

- Logo of St John Ambulance

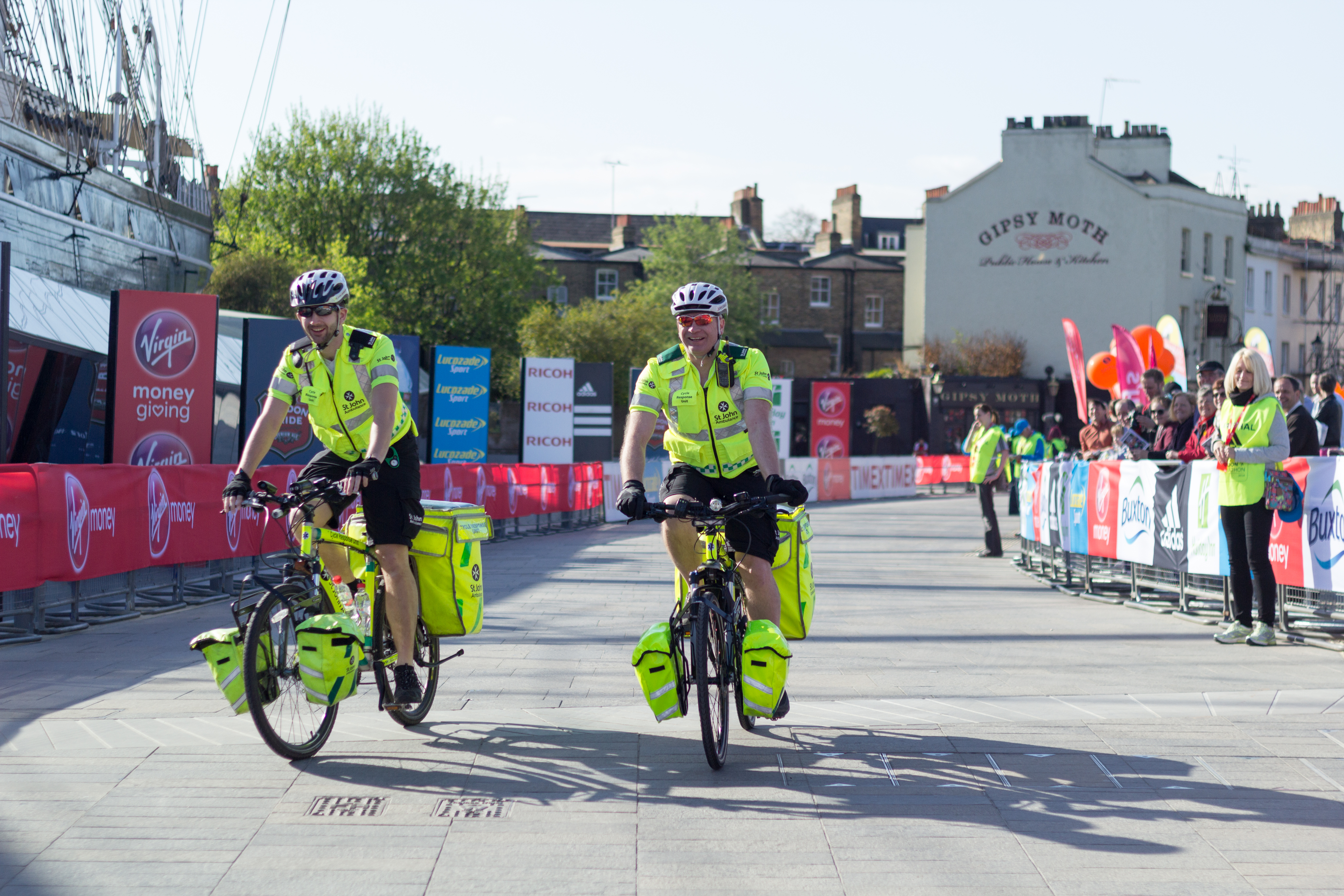
- St John Ambulance Cycle Response Unit (CRU) volunteers at the London Marathon
- Pronunciation: /sənt dʒɒn æm.bjə.ləns, sənt-/
- Predecessor: St John Ambulance Brigade
- Formation: 1887; 139 years ago
- Founded at: London
- Type: Charitable organisation Limited company
- Registration no.: 1077265
- Legal status: Active
- Purpose: Teaching and providing first aid Providing of first aid equipment
- Headquarters: St. John's Lane, London, England, EC1M 4DA
- Coordinates: 51.521815°N 0.102438°W
- Region served: England
- Products: First aid equipment
- Services: Training and providing of medical advice First aid at events
- Official language: English
- Prior and Chair of St John Ambulance: Stuart Shilson
- Chief Executive: Shona Dunn
- Chief Commissioner: Kevin Munday
- Chief Commander: Carole Lawrence-Parr
- Affiliations: St John Ambulance; Johanniter International
- Revenue: £107.9m (2023)
- Expenses: £124.1m (2023)
- Staff: 1,323 (2024)
- Volunteers: 31,848 (2023)
- Website: www.sja.org.uk

St John Ambulance is a charitable non-governmental organisation dedicated to the teaching and practice of first aid and the support of the national emergency response system in England. Along with St John Ambulance Cymru, St John Ambulance Northern Ireland, and St John Scotland, it is one of the four United Kingdom affiliates of the international St John Ambulance movement.

The St John Ambulance Association was founded in 1877 to provide first aid training. In 1887, the St John Ambulance Brigade was founded to provide uniformed medics at public events. In 1968, the two were merged into the present foundation. The organisation is a subsidiary of the England and the Islands priory (i.e. branch) of the Order of St John. Until 2012, it also managed St John Ambulance services in the Isle of Man and Channel Islands.

In 2022, St John Ambulance was commissioned by NHS England to provide England's ambulance auxiliary.

== History ==
=== Background ===
After the original Order of St John, the Knights Hospitallers, was disbanded by Henry VIII in 1540, an idea to re-establish the Order within England was put forward, starting in 1826, by some remaining French Knights of the original worldwide Order. By 1841, the St John's Day Declaration was prepared to seek official recognition of the new Order by the original Order, now known as the Sovereign Military Order of Malta.

=== Foundation ===
The St John Ambulance Association was set up on 10 July 1877 by the Venerable Order of Saint John to teach industrial workers first aid so that they could provide on-the-spot treatment in emergencies. Workers rarely had ready access to a doctor in 19th-century workplaces, and since accidents were frequent, death or disability from injuries was common. The organisation in Ipswich was founded in 1880.

In 1887, trained volunteers were organised into a uniformed Brigade to provide a first aid and ambulance service at public events. In many parts of England (and in parts of Scotland, until 1908), St John Ambulance was the first and only provider of an ambulance service right up to the middle of the 20th century, when the National Health Service was founded. The St John Ambulance Brigade and St John Ambulance Association merged in 1968 to form St John Ambulance, a single organisation providing both training and first aid cover.

In 1908, a reciprocal agreement led to the cessation of the St John Ambulance Brigade's operations in Scotland and St Andrew's Ambulance Association's operations in England. The organization later expanded by forming the St John Ambulance Cadets in March 1922. By 1968, the Association and Brigade merged into a unified entity known as St John Ambulance.

The organisation celebrated its 140th anniversary between 2017 and 2018. In August 2022, St John Ambulance was commissioned as NHS England's ambulance auxiliary.

A significant restructure in 2012 consolidated 43 counties into eight large regions; these regions were then further merged in 2016 into four regions. During 2013, St John Ambulance trained approximately 278,000 adults through its workplace and community first aid programmes, and directly trained 91,000 schoolchildren. St John Ambulance personnel attended 45,000 public events, treating approximately 102,000 individuals. It also distributed 100,000 free first aid guides nationwide and its free smartphone app was downloaded by 148,000 people.

St John Ambulance announced a major restructure in June 2024 following deficits of £16.6m across the organisation.

=== Historic child sex abuse scandal ===
In 1998, members of a paedophile ring that operated from within the St John Ambulance Brigade for several decades were arrested by police. The ring was headed by Leslie Gaines, superintendent of the Farnborough Division of the Brigade in Hampshire.

== Ambulance services ==
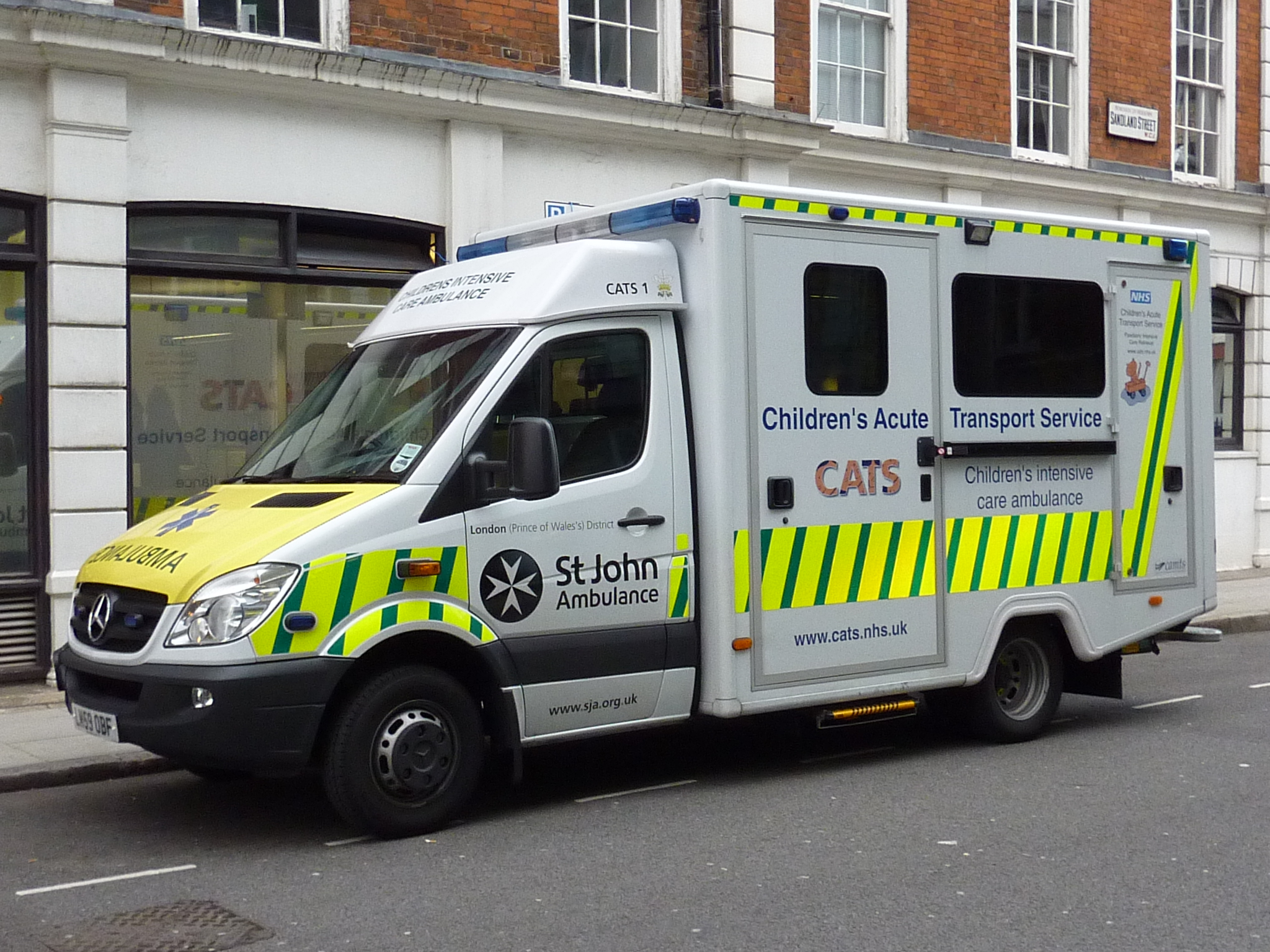
(CATS 1) St John Ambulance

St John Ambulance supplies ambulance services in England, providing services to over 100,000 people a year and working in partnership with NHS trusts, private healthcare groups, local authorities and individuals. Ambulance Operations, the division of the organisation responsible for the provision of ambulances, provides a range of services including NHS front-line ambulance support (999 and 111 calls), specialist transfer services for paediatric and neonatal patients and specialist emergency response services for bariatric patients.

In 2010, St John Ambulance was awarded the Private Ambulance Service Team of the Year Award by the Ambulance Services Institute for the work it carried out with the CATS (Great Ormond Street) and the South Thames Retrieval Service (Evelina Children's Hospital).

=== The 'National Ambulance Auxiliary' ===
In August 2022, St John Ambulance began a four-year contract with NHS England to provide an auxiliary ambulance service. Some Ambulance Operations volunteers and employees deployed in emergency ambulances on behalf of NHS Ambulance Service trusts in England, responding to all categories of 999 calls (depending on the area and NHS pressure).

In April 2025, St John Ambulance announced that NHS England would end the National Ambulance Auxiliary, bringing the contract to an end 12 months earlier than anticipated.

== Medical supplies ==
St John Ambulance Supplies (often abbreviated to SJS) is a trading sub-division of St John Ambulance providing first aid and medical equipment and publications. Where a profit is made, surplus from sales are diverted into supporting the charitable work of the Order of St John and the St John Ophthalmic Hospital in Jerusalem. SJS opened its doors at St John's Gate in Clerkenwell on 12 February 1879, and was originally known as The Stores Depot.

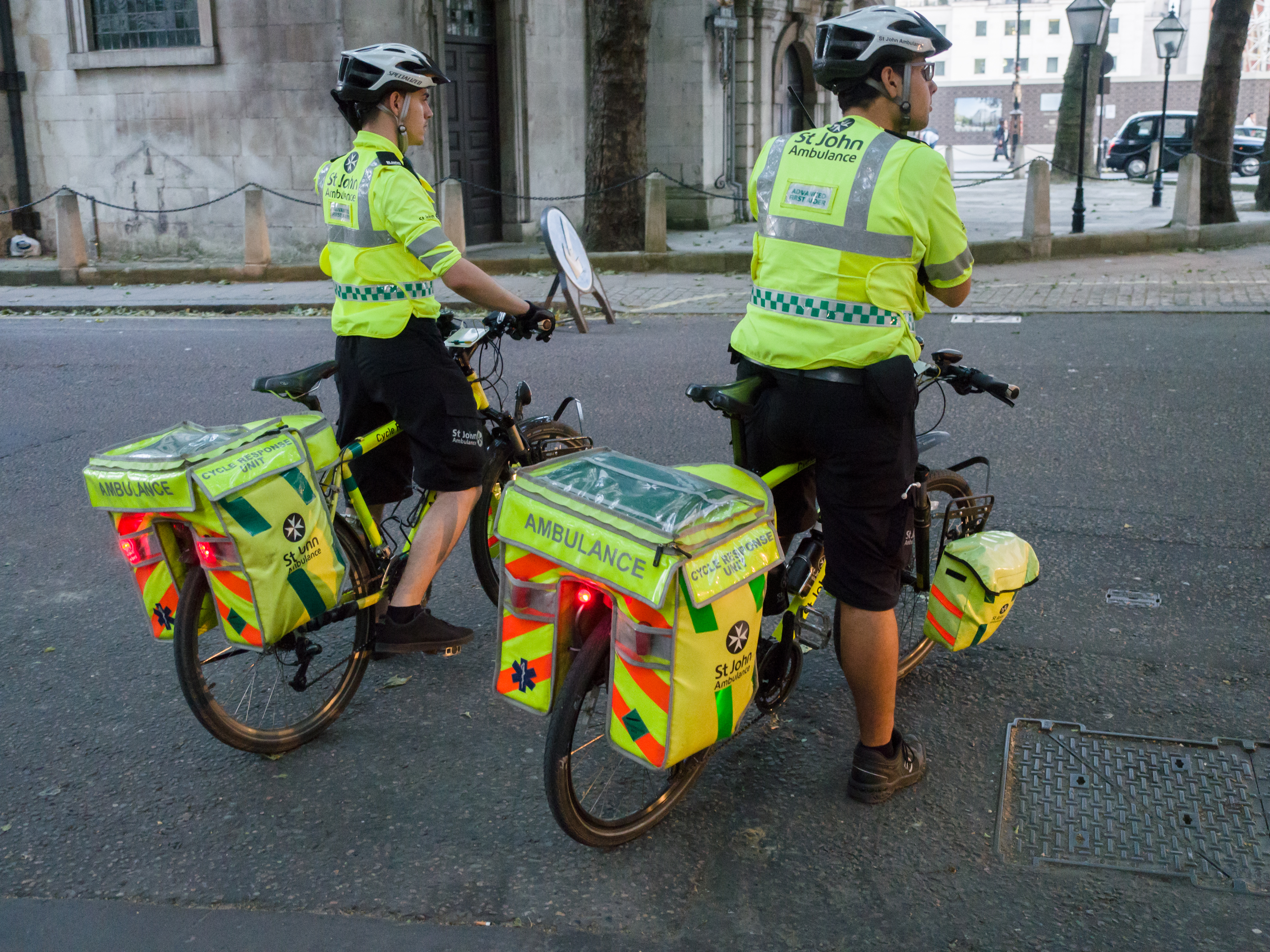
Cycle Response Unit (CRU) members providing cover at an event in London in 2014

St John Ambulance also provides first aid cover in events such as the London Marathon, as well as smaller events such as fetes and local fairs. This service is provided free to patients at the point of delivery, although a charge is often made to the event organiser for provision of the service at their event. St John Ambulance can also provide cycle responders as well as mobile treatment centres and other medical provision.

== Night-time economy ==
St John Ambulance provides first aid in many towns at night, particularly on weekends and public holidays. First aiders deliver first aid to members of the public. St John Ambulance often have ambulances crewed by their Emergency Ambulance Crews (EACs) who can respond to emergency calls within the city centre from the 999 system.

== Workplace and commercial training ==
=== Training courses ===
St John Ambulance runs courses in first aid and health and safety for members of the public, training 254,000 people in 2013. Its First aid at work course is used by many companies to train designated individuals as first aiders, as required by employment laws; specialist training is also available. Charitable community first aid courses also offer people of all ages the chance to learn basic first aid skills at little or no charge. In 2013, 24,000 people attended these courses.

== Volunteer clinical training ==
Those volunteering to provide event first aid services begin as first aiders, by attending a four-day Operational First Aid (FA) course covering common injuries and illnesses, over-the-counter medication administration, in addition to organisation-specific elements such as safe discharge and patient report forms. Further progression is to the Advanced First Aider (AFA) course, a four-day course covering medical gases administration, taking vital signs and manual handling with equipment. Advanced First Aider is the standard required for entry to the Cycle Response Unit, Medical Response Team (a specialist resource for working in dense crowds) and to be considered for selection for Ambulance Training.

=== First aid roles ===
In early 2024, St John Ambulance announced a change to its internal first aid training for volunteers, primarily driven by changes to the "Purple Guide", the assumed outcome of Martyn's Law and the perceived future regulation of event first aid. Transition of existing volunteers is currently underway and the first aid qualifications of Operational First Aid and Advanced First Aider are planned to be withdrawn by the end of 2025, two new roles have been introduced in their place: Community First Aider and Emergency Responder.

==== Community first aider ====
This basic first aid role is intended to equip volunteers with the skills to attend very small, low risk, non-licensed events that require simple first aid provision (e.g. village fetes). The CFA role is primarily intended for those that wish to attend fundraising, community engagement and PR events. The course has a total qualification time of 26 hours and is level B on the PHEM framework, meaning CFAs are unable to attend licensed events unless working under direct supervision as part of a wider team.

==== Emergency responder ====
The role will become the new minimum standard for first aid provision at licensed events. The qualification that underpins this role is the Level 3 Award in Immediate Response Emergency Care (IREC3). St John Ambulance has based the scope of practice for this role on the Advanced First Aider competencies, including:

- Basic life support (BLS), with bag valve mask ventilation
- Catastrophic bleed management, along with additional skills such as Ten Second Triage.
- Patient assessment skills (inc. blood pressure, blood glucose, temperature & pulse oximetry)
- Fracture management & immobilisation
- Assisting with extrication of the injured
- Administration of Oxygen, Entonox, Penthrox and GSL medications

=== Emergency Ambulance Crew (EAC) ===
Emergency Ambulance Crew (EAC) is the minimum qualification required to crew an emergency ambulance for the charity and currently the highest clinical role available to non-registrants. EAC training, open only to existing volunteers, takes the form of a 30-day training program delivered in a blended modular format over six months. Once qualified, EACs must spend a minimum of twelve months as Newly Qualified Emergency Ambulance Crew (NQEAC) with restrictions on crewing combinations before being allowed to practice autonomously. EACs are required to volunteer a minimum of 240 hours each year to demonstrate ongoing clinical exposure.

EAC is intended to be a clinical role similar to that of a Technician or AAP, with EACs working both on events and providing NHS 999 support on an ad-hoc basis. When deployed by St John Ambulance at events, EAC crews are equipped and deployed in the same manner as an AAP/EMT, including the same medications formulary and scope of practice.

Clinical competencies include:

- Comprehensive patient assessment skills, including patient monitoring and 12-lead ECG acquisition & recognition of gross abnormalities (inc. STEMI)
- Immediate Life Support (ILS) skills, including supraglottic airway devices and capnography
- Administration of 'life-saving', analgesic and GSL medications (Penthrox, Oxygen, Entonox, Salbutamol, Adrenaline 1:1000, Glucagon, Hydrocortisone, Naloxone, Ipratropium Bromide, GTN, Ibuprofen, Paracetamol, Aspirin, Loratidine, Glucose)
- Assessment and management of Medical, Surgical, Traumatic and Obstetric emergency presentations
- Catastrophic haemorrhage control (inc. Pelvic splinting, chest seals, haemostatic dressings, gauze & tourniquets)
- Fracture management inc. Splinting & Traction devices
- Manual handling, inc. extrication devices, immobilisation aids & Mangar Elk lifting devices.
- Appropriate disposition of patients, including discharge rights from events, referral to alternative care, routine and emergency transport to NHS receiving centres, inc. bypass to pPCI
- Major Incident readiness: Ten Second Triage & MITT
- Assisting other clinicians: IV fluid assist, Cannulation assist

In addition to clinical training, the Level 3 Certificate in Emergency Response Ambulance Driving (CERAD) blue light driving course is available to fully qualified EACs. This may either be delivered as a modulated weekend course or as a four-week full time course.

The EAC qualification has been internally developed by St John Ambulance and, in contrast to most ambulance providers, it is not underpinned by a regulated qualification. SJA suggest that the course is based upon Associate Ambulance Practitioner (AAP) and Emergency Medical Technician (EMT) competencies and skills. The decision to continue awarding an unregulated qualification has presented commercial challenges to the charity's ambulance operations due to the resulting variability in its acceptance with NHS ambulance trusts

=== Other specialist roles ===
In addition to the clinical training offered, members have the opportunity to carry out other operational roles. These include event planning, event management, radio communications/control, plus other support roles.

=== Healthcare professionals ===
St John operational deployments of HCPs are based on the individuals' expertise, and the charity assigns professionals to a "pillar of practice". These pillars are "Health Care", "Urgent Care", "Emergency Care" and "Critical Care". Healthcare professionals wear coloured rank slides to distinguish them from internally trained first aiders and ambulance personnel.

== Youth ==
St John Ambulance teaches first aid to young people through programmes, including Badgers (for seven- to ten-year-olds), Cadets (ten- to seventeen-year-olds), Student Volunteering Units (based in colleges and universities) and RISE, a specialist project aimed at those not in education, employment or training. Cadets volunteer alongside their adult counterparts on events. In January 1987, Badger Setts were introduced to celebrate 100 years since the formation of the Brigade. Further structural changes occurred in 1999 with the formation of the Priory of England and the Islands.

In 2013, 91,000 schoolchildren were trained in first aid by St John Ambulance's schools team. In 2014, the organisation launched The Big First Aid Lesson, a free first aid lesson that was streamed live into classrooms across England. 32,384 students took part in the inaugural event. Events took place the following three years. The Big First Aid Lesson was not held in 2018 to let the team focus on promoting first aid as part of the national curriculum. One of the St John Ambulance units, formerly known as LINKS units, were originally established at universities to form a "link" between Cadets and adult volunteering.

=== Super Badger Award ===
St John Ambulance Badgers work towards the "Super Badger Award". This award consists of members completing 12 subjects, such as "Creative", "Global" and "Wild" Badger. The award is split into five sections, where Badgers advance through completing more subjects. Badgers who achieve their Super Badger receive a ceramic trophy of Bertie Badger, the Badger mascot, dressed in the original Badger uniform. The programme was reviewed and redesigned in 2016, and the new version launched in 2017, coinciding with the 30th anniversary of the formation of Badgers.

=== Grand Prior's Award scheme ===
The Grand Prior's Award is the primary award designed for Cadets. The award consists of the completion of 16 subjects throughout Cadet membership, until the age of 18. The programme started being reviewed and updated in early 2017 and was released in mid-2021.

=== Amalfi Challenge ===
The Amalfi Challenge was open to all Cadets and adult volunteers aged 16 to 25. The structure of the award involved goals set by the individual themselves, and undertaking tasks categorised into service, relationships, society and challenge, with the Amalfi Award being achieved by completing 12 such tasks. The Amalfi Challenge is discontinued in England.

=== The Sovereign's Award ===
The Sovereign's Award is given to young St John Ambulance volunteers. It is awarded to a maximum of ten people worldwide each year. The award is presented at the Young Achievers' Reception hosted by Anne, Princess Royal, Commandant-in-Chief for Youth. The event is also attended by the National Cadet of the Year for England and the Islands, National Cadet of the Year for Cymru Wales, Regional Cadets of the Year from England and the Islands, Deputy Cadet of the Year for Cymru Wales, District Cadets of the Year and nominated young people, aged 7–17.

== Campaigns ==
Its 2013 Save the Boy campaign, demonstrating how to put a casualty in the recovery position, reached 15 million people through television and online media.

In January 2015, it launched a new campaign, The Chokeables, designed to teach parents how to treat a choking infant. The animated film featured the voices of actors John Hurt, David Walliams, Johnny Vegas and David Mitchell.

During the annual Save a Life September campaign, St John Ambulance trainers hold free first aid demonstrations in public spaces around the country, handing out first aid guides to attendees. A free first aid app for smartphones is also available to download.

Between 9–16 October 2018, St John Ambulance was involved in the promotion of Restart A Heart Day 2018, overseen by the Resuscitation Council UK, on behalf of the European Resuscitation Council and the International Liaison Committee on Resuscitation. St John Ambulance and partner organisations trained over 200,000 people in emergency resuscitation during the two weeks.

In 2022, St John Ambulance partnered up with BBC Radio Manchester following the inquiry into the Manchester Arena bombing. St John volunteers provided free emergency first aid awareness to the public throughout Manchester, and between May and December, over 16,000 members of the public were trained.

== Vehicles ==
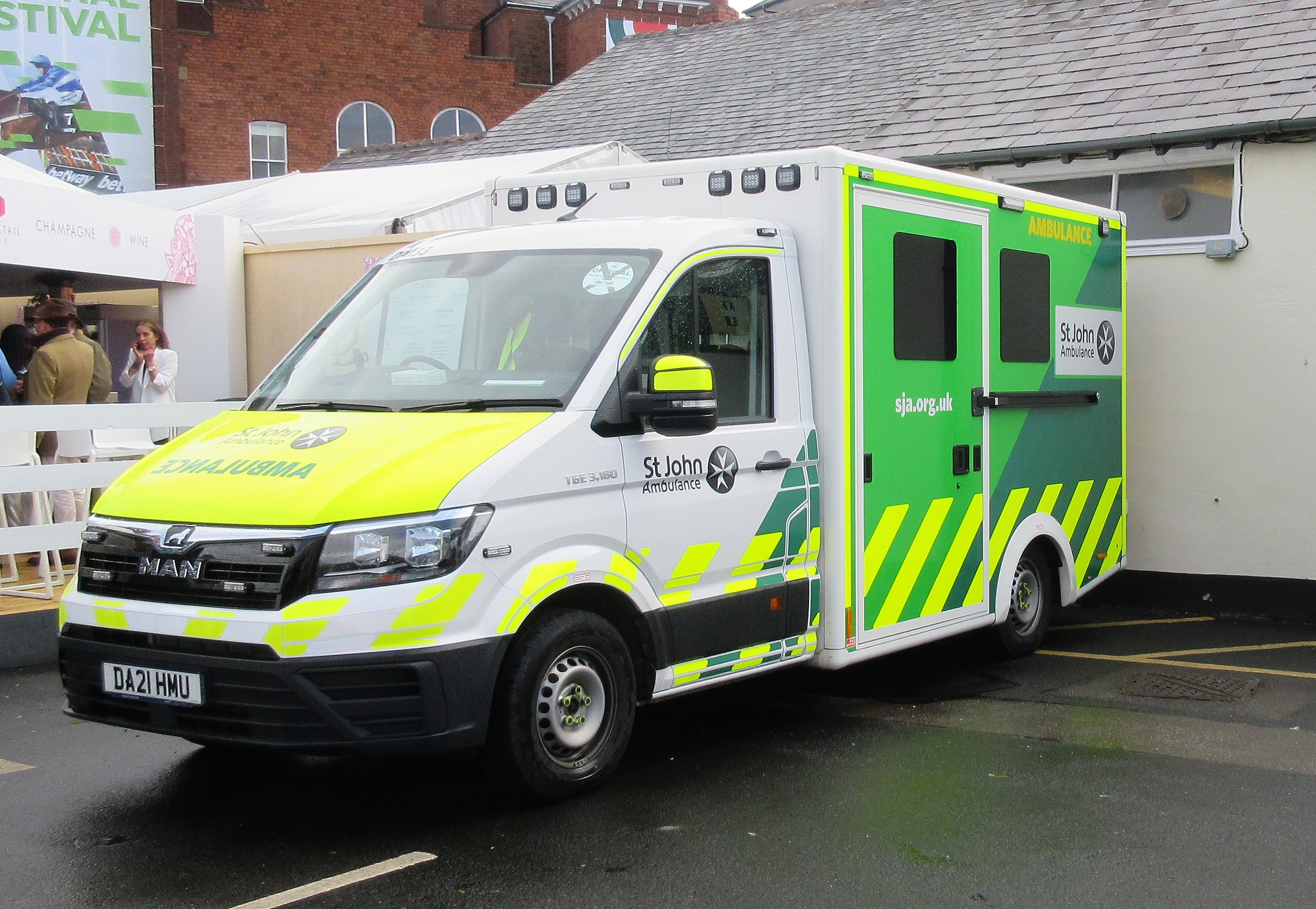
A St John Ambulance MAN TGE parked at an event

Originally, individual divisions of St John Ambulance were responsible for providing their own vehicles. These have taken many and varied forms, beginning with horse-drawn ambulances and even went into the late twentieth century with some centralisation of control and classification of vehicle types such as Motor Ambulance Units (the title arising historically as a distinction from horse-drawn units), First Aid Posts and Rapid Deployment Vehicles. At the start of the twenty-first century, new legislation regarding emergency ambulances rendered a significant proportion of the then-current St John Ambulance fleet redundant. This led to the development of a specialist St John Ambulance vehicle, which was designed jointly by the organisation and vehicle manufacturer Renault. The result was the Crusader 900 ambulance.

An early assessment suggested that 100 of the Crusader ambulances (costing, at that time, £40,000 each) would be required immediately, representing an investment of £4 million. In 2000, St John Ambulance raised £2 million by public subscription, whilst English and Welsh Freemasons committed a further £2 million, supplying 50 Crusader ambulances which were handed over in local ceremonies across the country during 2000 and 2001. Subsequently, local provinces of Freemasons have supported the running costs of these vehicles.

By 2004, the national St John Ambulance emergency vehicle fleet has the following standard vehicle types:

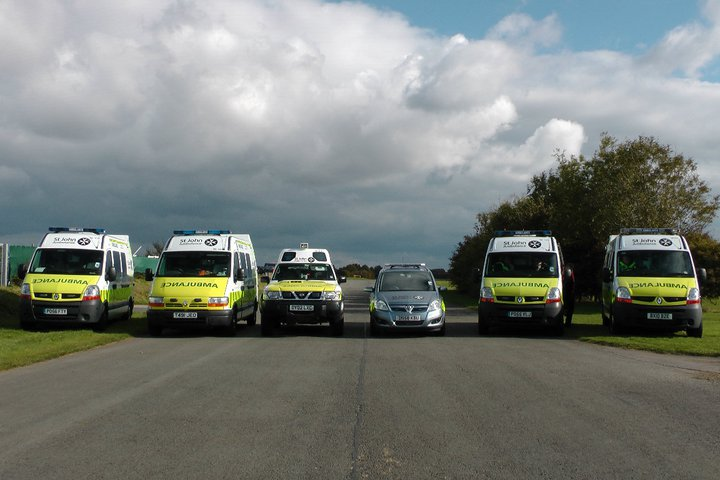
The retired vehicles St John used from 2000 to 2023: (left-to-right) two Crusaders, a Challenger, a Companion Plus and two Crusaders.

- Crusader – a front-line emergency ambulance, based on the Renault Master (or similar);
- 4×4 ambulance – a four-wheel drive emergency ambulance that is based on the Nissan Patrol (or something similar), but with additional headroom for rural and off-road deployment; and
- Support vehicles – either based on a van, car or a 4×4 vehicle, Support Units can be used for a variety of purposes. For instance, a Support Car may be used to carry members to and from duties, in a logistical capacity, or even as a response vehicle on larger duties. Support Vans are normally used only for logistical purposes. Mini-buses are also available and can be used for logistics or the transport of members.

St John Ambulance also maintains specialist response options in particular locations, such as Cycle Response Units, Control and Command Units, Rapid Response Cars (Specialist Contracts), Community Support Units as well as larger vehicles or trailers used as static first aid posts.

In 2020, St John undertook a review of its fleet capabilities. Many older vehicles were retired from service with a gradual replacement with newer models based on the MAN TGE 3.5-tonne chassis. Box-body and AWD variants of the MAN ambulance were introduced in late 2020, in a new, green style. As of October 2020, the organisation has 250 vehicles in its fleet. By 2023, all "Crusader-era" vehicles had been retired from the fleet; it was to be replaced by MAN TGE builds.

== Regional structure ==
=== St John Ambulance regions ===
In 2012, St John Ambulance was reorganised into a regional structure. St John Ambulance in Guernsey, Jersey and the Isle of Man became separate from England. Previously, the organisation had been divided into 42 semi-autonomous county organisations. Each region is managed by a paid regional director and is responsible for the delivery of programmes developed and overseen by the national headquarters (NHQ). All regions are accountable to the Care Quality Commission (CQC) and are independently inspected by the CQC against 14 different outcomes, such as care and welfare of people who use the services, cleanliness and infection control and supporting workers. Later, in 2016, St John Ambulance reorganized their regions into four main ones. The four regions are:

- East – East of England and East Midlands
- London & South – London and the South East
- North – North East, North West and Yorkshire and the Humber
- West – West Midlands and South West

=== Districts and units ===
Each region is divided into several districts. A district may contain one or more former counties from the previous structure and may only have part of a county in. Each district is managed by a district manager (volunteer), and area managers report to them. Each district usually contains three to six areas. Districts are further divided into geographic areas, led by an area manager. Unit managers report to the area manager, and the area manager is in overall charge of the activities of the units in their area. They are assisted and advised by district specialists. Each area usually contains 8–15 units.

A unit (formerly a division) is the smallest administrative division of St John Ambulance. Most volunteers are managed within a unit by another volunteer. An adult unit is led by a unit manager, who may have one or more assistant unit managers to assist them. The unit usually has a weekly meeting where members train and occasionally have visits from guest speakers. There are two types of youth units: Badger Setts (for ages 7–10) and cadets (for ages 10–18). Historically, there were ambulance divisions (for men), nursing divisions (for women), ambulance cadet divisions (for boys) and nursing cadet divisions (for girls). No single-sex divisions remain.

==== British Armed Forces ====
A section of St John Ambulance, St John Ambulance British Forces Overseas (SJABFO), has British units running where there are a large number of British servicemen and women with their families overseas; these are namely in Cyprus. St John Ambulance British Forces Overseas works closely with the German Ambulance Services, particularly the sister organisation, Die Johanniter. St John Ambulance can also be seen working with Malteser, the German Red Cross and local fire brigades which provide ambulance services. The units in Germany began to prepare for the British withdrawal from Germany in 2019. The overseas forces units (then "divisions") were founded in 1980, while the two units in Cyprus were founded in 1991.

=== Ambulance operations ===
Whilst all employed and volunteers are assigned a hub, Emergency Ambulance Crew are also seconded to a "Virtual Ambulance Unit" structured around the regional NHS ambulance trust they deploy in support of. CPD, portfolio support and ambulance development is managed through the volunteer ambulance unit whilst those pertaining to the individual is managed through the home unit.

== Uniform and ranks ==
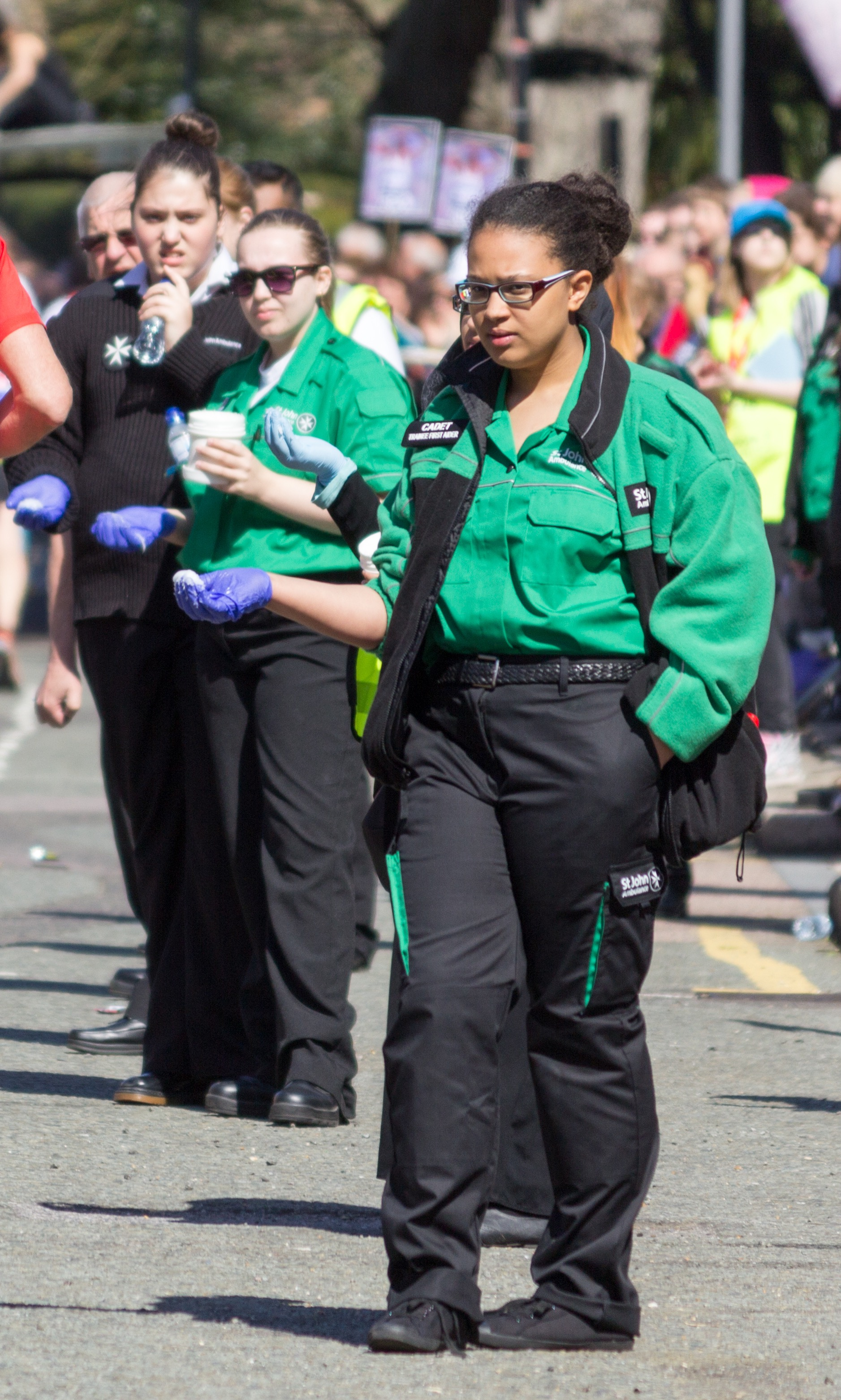
Personnel in the current uniform (centre and right) and the old uniform (left)

A diagram of the uniform design, post-2013

St John Ambulance first aid personnel wear a service delivery uniform consisting of a green shirt; black combat trousers; and either a green and black Parka Jacket, a reversible fleece, or green and black softshell jacket with black footwear. Epaulettes on the shirts vary in colour depending on the profession of the volunteer: Black for first aid personnel, green for registered paramedics, grey for registered nurses, and red for registered doctors. Healthcare professionals' (HCPs) epaulettes do not show specialism such as midwives. Student HCPs wear black epaulettes until they are qualified in their respective profession. A ceremonial uniform still exists for adult volunteers, consisting of a peaked cap, tailored jacket, white shirt, black trousers, black shoes and a clip-on tie. All rank insignia are worn on the outer layer of the jacket.

On the service delivery uniform, a role bar is worn to denote the wearer's role in that event. Two-tone yellow-and-green tabards (accepted to denote medical personnel) are only worn when the risk assessment of the event calls for it.

Badgers wear a branded black polo-shirt and a branded black jumper, where they can wear the badges they earn through the Super Badger programme.

Cadets wear the same uniform as their adult counterparts, though are permitted to wear a brassard on their left arm (during ceremonial processions only; not whilst performing clinical duties) where they are able to show their current/highest Grand Prior Award badge at the top-centre; up to three badges, including duty hours, Duke of Edinburgh Award, Sovereign's Award, national competitions winners badge, Amalfi Challenge (discontinued) or Diana Award (if won for services to St John Ambulance); and the Super Badger award (if achieved) at the bottom of the brassard.

== Partnerships ==
Although the Order of St John is largely seen as a Christian organisation for historical reasons, St John Ambulance does not restrict membership to any particular religion or denomination; adult members are not required to support either the monarchy or the Christian faith. Historically, Cadet members pledged to join to the monarch and God, though this is no longer a requirement.

St John Ambulance personnel serve alongside the British Red Cross, whose members also undergo advanced training in first aid and event cover. However, the British Red Cross no longer has an event first-aid (EFA) department due to lack of profit and funding. (The Red Cross EFA department officially closed in March 2020.) Both organisations' work supports the statutory services in times of civil emergency or crisis. In peacetime, St John Ambulance is senior to the Red Cross. However, in wartime, the Red Cross would become senior due to an agreement with the International Red Cross and Red Crescent Movement.

St John Ambulance, St. Andrew's First Aid of Scotland and the British Red Cross co-author and authorise the official First Aid Manual, the de facto UK guide for emergency first aid.

== COVID-19 pandemic ==
During the COVID-19 pandemic in England, St John Ambulance equipped their personnel with protective equipment to prevent the spread. In March 2020, the charity had around 8,500 volunteers available to support alongside the NHS in hospitals. This was trialed the same month, which saw volunteers in NHS hospitals across England, including the NHS Nightingale Hospital London.

St John Ambulance announced in January 2021 that their staff would be volunteering to help in the national vaccination program for the Oxford–AstraZeneca vaccine alongside NHS staff. 30,000 vaccination volunteers were recruited and trained between November 2020 and March 2021. The programme was hit by several technical problems throughout its operation, including using the rostering system GRS, which had not been used by the charity before. There were delays to volunteers being able to deploy to vaccination centres.

Due to the decrease in public events throughout 2020, when Event Operations began to restart in 2021, the charity provided additional training for vaccination volunteers to be able to support Event Operations as First Aiders. Following the Great North Run 2021 and Brighton Marathon 2021, the programme was rolled out more extensively, primarily in London, and was informally called the SJA Reserves Programme. The programme trained a significant number of vaccination volunteers to support some of the charity's Event Operations, including the London Marathon, the Platinum Jubilee of Queen Elizabeth II, and the funeral of Elizabeth II.

Between July and September 2022, St John Ambulance sought an additional 5,000 vaccination volunteers to support the programme. The Association of Independent Multiple Pharmacies (AIMP) said that it had not received sufficient vaccine stock to "meet demand". The organisation's involvement with the vaccination programmes ended on 31 March 2023, having delivered 1.7 million hours to the overall COVID-19 response.

== See also ==
- St John Ambulance Ireland
- Service Medal of the Order of St John
