= St John Ambulance Australia Cadets =

St. John Ambulance Australia Youth
- Formation: 9 December 1925
- Type: Volunteer youth organisation
- Purpose: First aid and youth development
- Headquarters: Canberra, Australia
- Members: 4,000
- Chief Cadet Officer: Dr Felix Ho ASM MStJ
- National Youth Manager: Belinda Ding
- Parent organization: St John Ambulance Australia
- Website: Website

The St John Ambulance Australian Youth is an organisation of St John Ambulance Australia that aims to teach and develop young people first aid and other skills with a spirit of community service. The movement has more than 3,500 youth members, aged between 12 and 18 across Australia.

Youth divisions operate in every state and territory in Australia, with the exception of Queensland and Western Australia. St John Ambulance Western Australia announced in March 2013 that the current cadet program would be abolished in that state, including the disbandment of all cadet divisions, to make way for a cadetship program for persons aged between 16 and 18 years old. And in 2017 St John Ambulance Queensland announced that their cadet program would be closed down and a first aid in schools program would replace it.

== History ==
=== Origins ===
Following the formation of St John Ambulance cadets in the United Kingdom in 1922, St John in Australia soon had one of the first overseas cadet divisions. This was the Glebe Ambulance Cadet Division which was registered on 19 December 1925. There was a lull in the registration of cadet divisions for approximately five years afterwards, with the next cadet divisions not being founded until 1930, with the registration of the North Sydney Nursing Cadet Division as well as the first in Victoria, Richmond Ambulance Cadet Division.

At the time, cadet divisions were separated into 'ambulance cadet divisions' and 'nursing cadet divisions', with only males being permitted in the former and females in the latter.

First ambulance cadet divisions in each Australian state and territory
State/territory	New South Wales	Victoria	Western Australia	South Australia	Tasmania	Queensland	Australian Capital Territory	Northern Territory
Ambulance Cadet Division	Glebe Ambulance Cadet Division.	Richmond Ambulance Cadet Division.	Fremantle Ambulance Cadet Division.	Prospect Ambulance Cadet Division.	Hobart No. 1 Ambulance Cadet Division.	Milton Ambulance Cadet Division.	Canberra-Reid Ambulance Cadet Division.	Darwin Cadet Division.
Year established	1925	1930	1936	1936	1936	1953	1960	early 1960s

First nursing cadet divisions in each Australian state and territory
State/territory	New South Wales	Victoria	Western Australia	South Australia	Tasmania	Queensland	Australian Capital Territory	Northern Territory
Nursing Cadet Division	North Sydney Nursing Cadet Division.	Williamstown Nursing Cadet Division.	Perth Metropolitan Nursing Cadet Division.	Adelaide No.1 Nursing Cadet Division.	Hobart No. 1 Nursing Cadet Division.	Milton Nursing Cadet Division.	Canberra-Lyneham Nursing Cadet Division.	Darwin Cadet Division.
Year established	1930	1933	1944	1937	1936	1953	1960	early 1960s

=== Cadet movement development in Australia ===
Cadet divisions, when established, were intended to be recruiting grounds for the adult divisions up until the early 1950s. This changed and the cadet movement organised itself to become a national youth organisation of itself.

In 1978, the Cadet Handbook was published for the first time by Australian Headquarters staff in Canberra. The handbook explains the rules and regulations under which cadets and the cadet organisation must operate, as well as providing important information to cadets and parents alike.

The 1970s also yielded another important development – a Chief Officer for Cadets was appointed to the national staff. They became responsible for the nationwide overall direction of cadets, as well as liaising with their state/territory counterparts. Since then, eight people have held the position to date.

Membership numbers were in decline during this period. After reaching their high point at 7,584 cadets in 321 divisions during the late 1960s, membership declined steadily until 1990 when there were a mere 4,128 cadets in 206 divisions. Since then, cadet membership has remained more or less at around 4,000.

=== 1990–present ===
The 1990s were an important decade for the cadet movement, in that a change of emphasis resulted from a review into the movement by the national staff in Canberra. It was decided that rather than treating the cadet organisation as merely a recruiting area for adult divisions, that it should be turned more into a true youth movement.

With this in mind, the Australian Youth Council was founded in 1997, composed of two representatives aged between 15 and 25 from each state/territory.

Cadet numbers have been in decline for some years, largely due to a lack of promotion and resources from state offices. St. John Ambulance in Western Australia even announced in March 2013 that the entire cadet movement would be abolished in that state, involving the dissolution of all cadet divisions and its replacement by an in-school program. A campaign opposing the changes has been organised, involving St. John members from across Australia. In 2017 it was announced that the cadet program in Queensland would dismantled by the end of the year. Cadets between 16–18 years old were given the option to join St John Event Health Services as volunteers. It was stated that they would be moving towards a first aid in schools program.

== Structure ==
- National Headquarters, St John Ambulance Australia
  - Australian Youth Advisory Network (AYAN)
- Chief Officer (Youth)
- State/territory headquarters
  - State/territory youth council
- State/territory youth officer
  - State/territory youth officers
- Area Youth Co-ordinators
- Divisional Youth staff
  - Youth officers
  - Youth leaders
  - Youth NCOs

State/territory youth councils only act in an advisory role with regards to youth policy and operations and do not have their own decision-making powers.

State/territory youth officers may appoint further officers to assist them in their duties, such as youth training.

Previously, the role of youth liaison officer in some states was in concert with the role of the regional youth officer, such as in Victoria where regional youth officers no longer exist. However, in some state/territories, regional youth officers still fulfil these roles.

Youth divisions are headed by a divisional officer, who is in turn assisted by youth leaders and youth NCOs. The divisional officer may also have adult members assisting them, as well as other divisional officers or adult NCOs. This often depends on the side of the division. Youth divisions may also be 'combined' with an adult division, meaning that they share resources and are essentially the same division, with the same divisional superintendent, same meeting place and same equipment. School divisions also exist across Australia, such as Bonnyrigg High School Division in Western Sydney, and Carey Grammar Division in Victoria.

=== Ranks ===
==== Youth members ====
Ranks and Insignia of St John Ambulance Australia Youth
Rank	Youth	Youth Squad Leader	Youth Senior Leader	Senior Youth	Senior Youth Squad Leader	Senior Youth Senior Leader	Youth Leader
Insignia							
Notes	Members aged between 12 and 14 years of age and in possession of a Youth First Aid Certificate	As for youth, but with leadership responsibilities.	As for youth, but with more leadership responsibilities than Youth Squad Leaders	Members aged between 15 and 18 and completed Provide First Aid.	As for Senior Youth, but with leadership responsibilities. Commonly referred to as a cadet corporal. Specific youth leadership training must be completed before achieving this role	As for Senior Youth, but with more leadership responsibilities than Senior Youth Squad Leaders. Often referred to as a cadet sergeant. Specific youth leadership training is required before being promoted to this role	An adult member between 18 and 25 that has undertaken a specific leadership course and is ranked above youth but below all adult ranks.

==== Youth officers ====
Ranks and Insignia of St John Ambulance (Youth officers up to State level)
Rank	Officer Grade 6	Officer Grade 5	Officer Grade 4	Officer Grade 3	Officer Grade 2	Officer Grade 1
Insignia						
Notes	Youth Divisional Officer.	Youth Divisional Officer.	Youth Divisional Superintendent, (Note: Only applicable if the cadet division is not combined with an adult division. In the case of a combined division, the adult divisional superintendent also acts as the cadet superintendent.) regional youth officer, youth liaison officer.	Regional youth officer, youth liaison officer.	State/Territory youth officer.	State/Territory Chief Officer (Youth).

Youth 11 to 18 years of age. Senior Youth (Blue) from 15 years of age.

== Australian Youth Advisory Network ==
AYAN is the primary body within St John for communicating and consulting with and representing the views of young members (aged 12 to 26 years).

AYAN aims to:

• communicate with young members in the places they hang out (e.g. on social media)

• consult with young people nationally and understand their point of view

• represent young peoples’ views to decision-makers in St John nationally

• help St John to achieve its goal of making first aid a part of everybody's life.

=== How does AYAN connect with young people? ===
AYAN use technology to regularly connect and engage with young people, advocating to and acting as a conduit to assist decision-makers to realise the goals of the organisation. You will find AYAN on Facebook and Instagram, and they have their own website—AYAN Website

=== Why AYAN? ===
AYAN believe that young people have a great deal to offer St John. AYAN want to share Young Members ideas, innovations and feedback with St John decision-makers, to promote a first aid culture in Australia and to contribute to a vibrant and sustainable St John.

=== Who is AYAN for? ===
AYAN is for all young members and their leaders. Whether you are an Adult Member, paramedic or other paid staff member, or involved in the Youth movement—AYAN want to hear from you.

== Training ==
The teaching of first aid to cadets and juniors is of primary importance to the movement. This training mainly takes place during weekly divisional meetings, but can also extend to statewide or nationwide events, such as the National Cadet Camp. Cadets learn a wide variety of first aid skills, including CPR, asthma treatment and bandaging.

=== Proficiency badges ===
There are currently 37 proficiency badges available to youth in Australia. These include awards in respect of:

- ANZAC heritage
- Boating
- Campcraft
- Canoeing
- Carers
- Caring for animals
- Casualty simulation
- Childcare
- Citizenship
- Communications
- Health and nutrition
- Cultural diversity
- Cycling
- Driver education
- Emergency management
- Employment preparation
- Environmental studies
- Eye health
- Family care
- Fire safety
- Handicrafts
- Health and wellbeing
- Home maintenance
- Hygienic food handling
- Indigenous studies
- International friendship
- Knowledge of the Venerable Order of St John
- Library skills
- Living skills
- Map reading
- Music
- Office skills
- Personal safety
- Public relations
- Road safety
- Sports
- Swimming and lifesaving

== Uniform ==
Youth members, as with adults, are usually required to regularly attend meetings and participate in divisional activities for at least a few months before receiving their uniform. This new initiative was instituted due to many new members being issued uniforms and then leaving soon afterwards, taking the uniforms with them and never returning them.

The youth uniform is similar to the Duty Order 1 adult uniform:

- White short-sleeved shirt with epaulette holders, pen holders and St. John flashes;
- Black long pants (or below-knee-height skirts for females);
- Black baseball cap with the St. John logo;
- Black clip-on tie;
- Black jumper with shoulder flashes, epaulettes, elbow patches and pen holders;
- Name plates;
- Black socks; and
- Black shoes.

Youth members are also issued with the appropriate epaulettes. They may also be issued with a high visibility vest for use on public duties. The distinctive black broad-brimmed hat is also no longer issued to youth members in Victoria due to budget cuts.

Cadets in Western Australia are instead issued the same uniforms as paramedics – known as "Greens". Their rank tag states "Cadet" on the front left breast pocket and on the rear of the shirt piece. All badges are reflective in design.

== Activities ==
Many different activities are provided for in the cadet programme. These include statewide and nationwide events, such as the national cadet camp and national cadet first aid championships.

The St John Ambulance Australia Cadet National Championship began in the 1960s. At the time there were 4 categories for competition; Ambulance Cadet Team, Ambulance Cadet Individual, Nursing Cadet Team and Nursing Cadet Individual. The Ambulance Cadet categories were for boys between 11 and 18 years of age and the Nursing Cadet categories were for girls of the same age. They were held on alternating years until 1985.

In 1985, the championships amalgamated when the girls and boys cadet groups joined. A two new categories were added, the Cadet Leader Individual and the Champion State/Territory, and the Ambulance and the Nursing trophies were reassigned to become singular team and individual Championships.

At this time, the St John National Champion badge was also introduced. Initially, it was only granted to the winners of the Cadet Team, Cadet Individual and Cadet Leader Championships, however, since 2003 it has been also granted to the winners of the Champion State/Territory, regardless of their rankings in their relevant events. Each year these competitions are held in January at the National Cadet Camp (NatCamp). In 2014, the camp and competitions will be held in New South Wales and will be an international camp with there being the National Championships but also the international competitions with countries invited to send competitors from all over the world where St John is established.

== Code of Chivalry ==
All cadets and juniors are required to recite the Code of Chivalry at least once during their membership. Many divisions will recite the code at the beginning or conclusion of every meeting. The code originates from the historical origins of St John Ambulance – the Venerable Order of St John.

The previous version of the code required cadets to 'serve God', but this was changed in the 1990s to 'serve my God' to avoid excluding those of no religion or those who are not Christian.

It has eight major points, representing the eight points of the Maltese cross of the Venerable Order of St John.

I promise

To serve God
To be loyal to the Sovereign and to my Officers
To observe the mottoes of the Order, which are:

Pro Fide – for the faith
Pro Utilitate Hominum – for the service of mankind

To be thorough in work and play
To be truthful and just in all things
To be cheerful and prompt in all I do
To help the suffering and the needy and
To be kind to all animals.

== Awards ==
Cadets have their own awards system, separate to adult members. These include both exemplary conduct and service awards. Awards are not worn on jumpers.

=== Exemplary conduct awards ===
Awards for exemplary conduct may vary throughout Australia, but in most states/territories there is some form of 'cadet of the year' award, usually with one award for male cadets and one award for female cadets. They are awarded to recognise excellence in the cadet movement.

Divisions may also have their own unofficial awards, which can vary.

=== Grand Prior's badge ===
This is the second highest award that a cadet can receive and is awarded to cadets who have earned 12 proficiency badges, including the Knowledge of the Order Badge and the Family Care Badge. The first Grand Prior's badges in the world were awarded in 1933 to three cadets – two from the United Kingdom and the other from Australia; Marion Higgins from Marrickville Cadet Nursing Division.

The award is worn on the left sleeve for as long as the cadet remains a member of the Operations Branch – even if they become an adult.

=== Commissioner's badge ===
Similar to the Grand Prior's badge, this award is the highest that any junior can achieve. It is awarded to juniors who have earned 10 interest badges and is worn on the right breast pocket of a shirt or battlejacket.

=== Southern Cross Award ===
The Southern Cross Award is designed to provide a flexible framework of personal development and achievement for members aged 16 to 25. The activities are not predetermined—youth members choose activities that are relevant to them. Youth members also set their own goals, work within their own time-frames and make their own decisions about what activities will help them achieve their award goals.

To complete this award youth members are required to progress through three levels: bronze, silver and gold, receiving a badge for each level completed. Each level has four subject areas. Youth members complete one activity from each of the subject areas for each badge moving progressively from bronze to gold.

To find out all about the award and download an application form visit AYAN Opportunities

=== The Sovereign's Award ===
The Sovereign's Award is the premier youth award in St John internationally. This is the only award to bear the personal signature of the Sovereign Head of the Order. It ranks immediately senior to the Grand Prior Award.

The Sovereign's Award is given to young members in recognition of outstanding work in three key areas:

1. personal development

2. benefit to St John Ambulance Australia

3. benefit to the community.

The format in which the candidate presents their final work may be of their own choice, but it must:

- demonstrate a need for the project in the community
- include a written summary or equivalent portfolio of work of the project that is of a high standard
- where a written piece is submitted, include appropriate referencing/citation of any sources used
- where a creative/non-written work is submitted, include a short explanatory piece on the project's purpose, how the idea came about/the need demonstrated in the community, its development over time and how it will be used to benefit the individual, community or St John
- be finalised within a three-year period, but not less than 18 months, from the commencement date.

=== Service awards ===
Cadets are able to attend public duties and treat patients within their scope of practice, provided that they are supervised by an adult. To acknowledge their contribution to St. John's work, a number of service shields have been developed. They include 100-hour, 200-hour and 500-hour service shields. In 1978, the Chief Commissioner introduced the Special Service Certificate, awarded to cadets who have completed at least 1000 hours of duties.

=== Other awards ===
Many other awards are available for cadets to wear and be awarded. These include external awards, such as the Duke of Edinburgh's Award.

== See also ==
- St John Ambulance Australia
- St John Ambulance Cadets in the UK
- St John Youth New Zealand
