= Grand Prior's Award =

The Grand Prior Award

The Grand Prior's Award, also called the Grand Prior Award, named for Grand Prior of the Venerable Order of Saint John, is the highest award that a cadet in the St. John Ambulance Youth Programme can achieve after the Sovereign's Gold Award. The Grand Prior's Award recognises a self-motivated and capable young person's ongoing commitment, compassion, and support. It is recognised and awarded internationally by various branches of the program. The Grand Prior's Award is recognised in many countries, including England and the Islands, Wales, Canada, Malaysia, New Zealand, and Australia.

== England and the Islands ==
Cadets begin to work on the Grand Prior's Award scheme after receiving the Membership award. The award scheme was named for the Grand Prior's of the Order of St John, the Duke of Gloucester. The award scheme involves cadets completing 16 subjects. Four subjects must be completed for the bronze level, four more for silver, and a further four for gold. After completing another four subjects, the cadet will be awarded with the Grand Prior's Award. Cadets can continue to work on this award until they are 21 years old.

== Malaysia ==
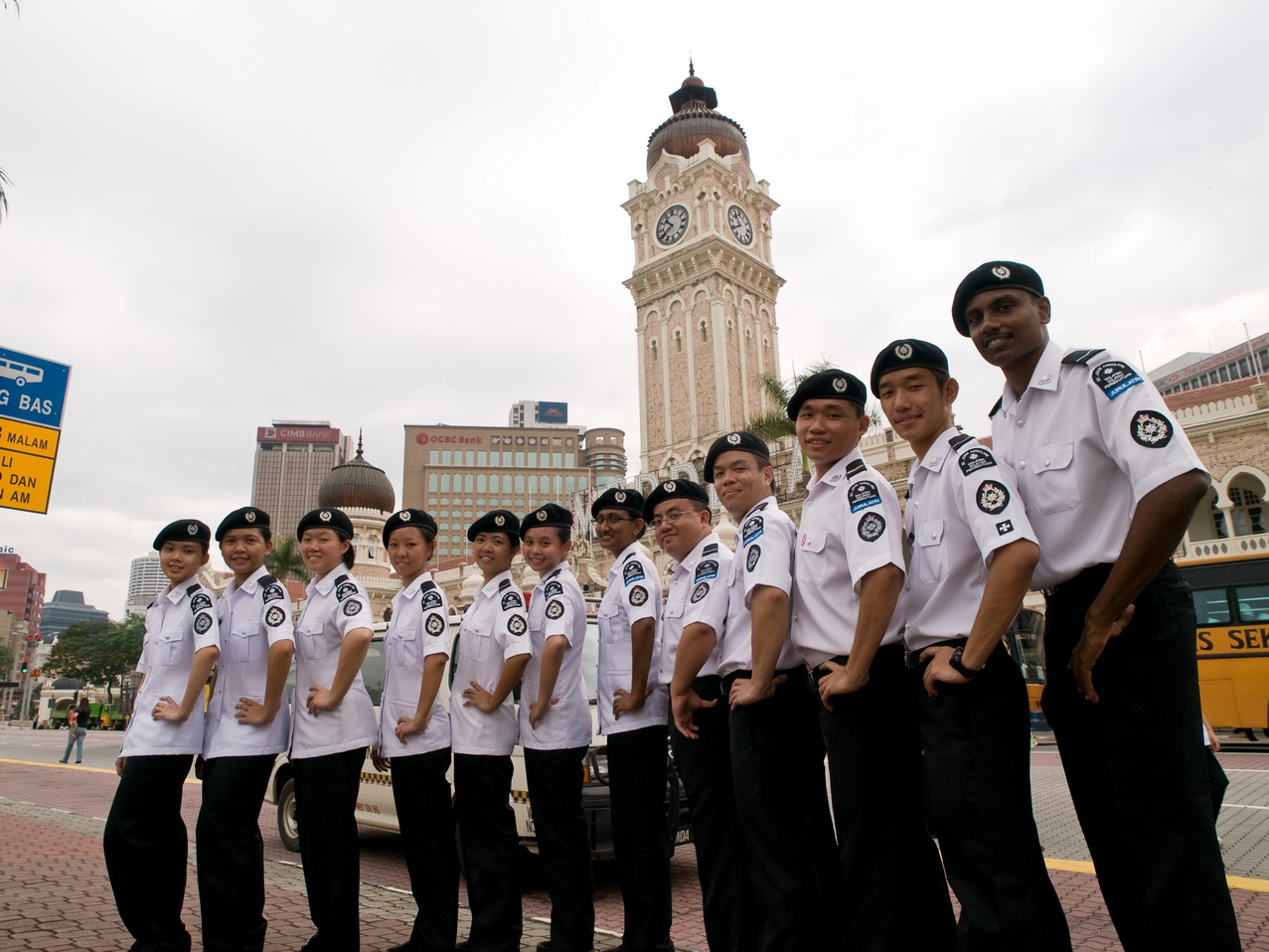
Recipients of the Grand Prior's Award in Malaysia

In its early years, the scheme had a different subject group (cycling, camping, tracking, etc.) than is used today. These groups were removed and merged to make the scheme that is currently used today. The 26 badges are split into five different groups according to the nature of the activities. These groups are: care, emergency care, leisure, communication, and life and social skills.

Cadets who successfully complete the Grand Prior's Award receive the award from the Order Secretariat in London, England. Cadets who obtain the Grand Prior's Award are known as Grand Prior Cadets and can wear the badge as adult members throughout their service in St John Ambulance.

=== Badge requirements ===
- 12 proficiency badges in total (include "Knowledge of the Order" badge)
- Took AT LEAST 1 badge and NOT MORE THAN 3 badges from each category
- The individual must be less than 21 years old on the date of assessment for their last badge
- To apply GRAND PRIOR AWARD before 16 years old must had 4 badge.

=== Badges ===
- Knowledge of the Order (compulsory)

==== Care ====
- Animal Care
- Care in the Community
- Caring for the Sick
- Caring for Children
- Anti Drug Abuse

==== Emergency Care ====
- Accident Prevention
- Fire Fighting and Prevention
- Casualty Simulation
- Personal Survival and Life Saving
- Civil Defence

==== Leisure ====
- Outdoor Pursuits
- Fitness
- Craft
- Map Reading and Navigation
- Musician

==== Communication ====
- Communication to the Impaired
- Administration Skills
- Computer Skills
- Signalling
- International Friendship

==== Life and Social Skills ====
- Citizenship
- Home Skills
- Cookery and Nutrition
- Do-It-Yourself
- Cadet Training Course

== New Zealand ==
In New Zealand, the GP proficiency badges are split into two levels: Blue (school years 7-9), and Gold (school years 10-13). Different level badges have different coloured frames and have learning criteria suited to the age range, with Gold level being the most difficult. Only the Gold level badges count towards the Grand Prior's Award. A cadet must meet the requirements described below to achieve the Grand Prior's Award. There are 14 badges to choose from.

=== Badge requirements ===
- Complete five Gold level compulsory badges and five other Gold level badges
- The cadet must be less than 21 years old on the date of assessment for their last badge
- The first gold level badge must be completed prior to the cadet's 18th birthday
- The cadet must have completed at least 100 hours of community service
- The cadet must have completed Level 2 First Aid (cadet must be 14+ to gain level 2 First Aid)

=== Gold level badges ===
- Adventures
- Casualty Simulation
- Child Development
- Community Engagement
- Drill and Ceremonies
- Emergency Management
- Environment
- Global Citizenship
- Healthcare
- Hauora
- Innovation
- Life Skills
- Safety
- St John

== Australia ==
The Grand Prior's Badge is the highest award that a cadet can receive and is awarded to cadets who have earned 12 proficiency badges, including the Knowledge of the Order Badge and the Family Care Badge. The first Grand Prior's badges in the world were awarded in 1933 to three cadets; two were from the United Kingdom, and the other, Marion Higgins from Marrickville Cadet Nursing Division, was from Australia. The award is worn on the left sleeve for as long as the cadet remains a member of the Operations Branch and is one of the only cadet badges that can be worn as an adult.
