= St. John Ambulance of Malaysia =

Medical organization

St. John Ambulance of Malaysia St. John Ambulans Malaysia سينت جون ايمبيولنس مليسيا 馬來西亞聖約翰救護機構 செயின்ட் ஜான் ஆம்புலன்ஸ் மலேசியா
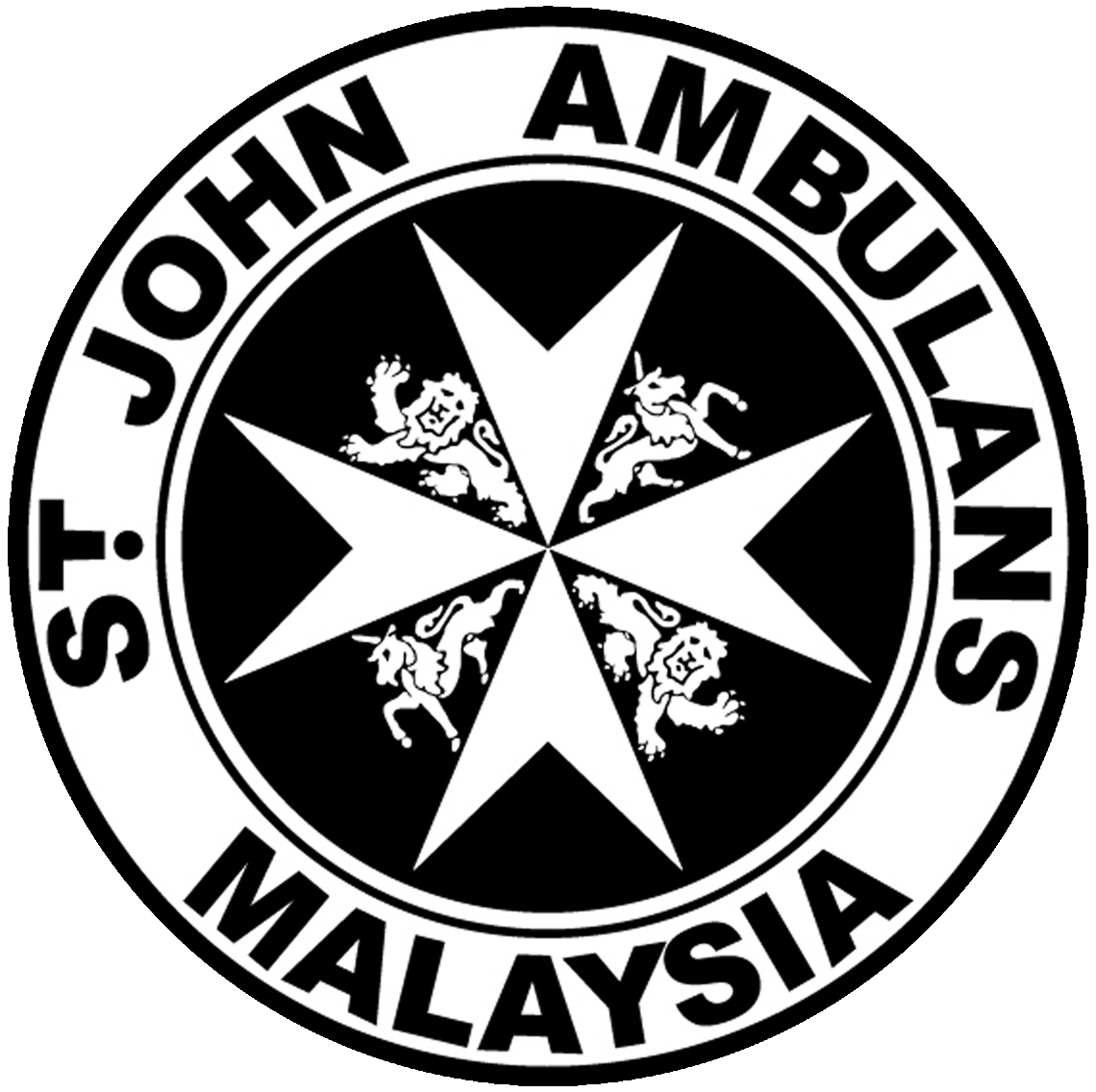
- Emblem of St. John Ambulance of Malaysia
- Abbreviation: SJAM
- Formation: 1908
- Type: Statutory body incorporated under the St. John Ambulance of Malaysia (Incorporation) Act 1972
- Purpose: First aid and pre-hospital care services
- Headquarters: 41 Shelley Road; 55100 Kuala Lumpur; Malaysia
- Location: Malaysia
- Commander-in-Chief: Dato' Lai See Ming, KStJ
- Affiliations: St. John Ambulance
- Website: https://www.sjam.org.my

St. John Ambulance of Malaysia (Rumi Malay: St. John Ambulans Malaysia, Jawi Malay: سينت جون ايمبيولنس مليسيا, traditional Chinese: 馬來西亞聖約翰救護機構; simplified Chinese: 马来西亚圣约翰救护机构, Tamil: செயின்ட் ஜான் ஆம்புலன்ஸ் மலேசியா, Abbreviation: SJAM) is a Malaysian-based, non-profit statutory body dedicated to the works of humanity and charity for the relief of persons in sickness, distress, suffering or danger without any distinction of race, class, colour or creed. With a history stretching back over a century, SJAM forms part of the wider St. John Ambulance, a foundation of the Venerable Order of Saint John with presence in 41 sovereign states, dependencies, autonomies or territories.

== History ==
The history of St. John Ambulance in the present day Malaysia started in 1908 with the formation of St. John Ambulance Association ("SJAA") by a group of medical officers in the Colonial Medical Service; Capt. Dr. John Sutton Webster, Dr. Richard Desmond Fitzgerald and Mr. Arthur Mitchell Goodman were among the pioneers of St. John Ambulance activities in the then British Malaya. When the war clouds were gathering in 1938, the British Administration decided to form the St. John Ambulance Brigade ("SJAB") in all larger towns. By 1939, SJAB could be found in the Federated Malay States and Straits Settlements, plus the unfederated states of Kelantan, Johor and Kedah. SJAB members were first recruited as stretcher-bearers. Once they were proficient, they attended first aid lectures. In early 1941, regular meetings and air raid practices were held with the Air Raid Precaution Corps.

In September 1941, the authorities introduced the Medical Auxiliary Service and all SJAB members were automatically drafted into this service. When the Japanese Forces raided the Malay Peninsula from 8 December 1941, the SJAB members did magnificent work in all the first aid posts. Many SJAB members withdraw to the south together with the British Forces as their towns were captured one after another by the Japanese Forces. Many more served in the Battle of Singapore and lost their lives for the Service of Mankind. St. John Ambulance was the only voluntary organisation in the Malay Peninsula that rendered medical services before and during the Second World War.

The return of the British after the end of the Second World War has resulted in the re-organisation of many institutions and that contributed to the expansion of SJAA and SJAB in Malaya and North Borneo.

In a move to further strengthen the operations of SJAA and SJAB, particularly after the independence of Malaya in 1957 and the subsequent merger between Malaya, Sabah and Sarawak (to form Malaysia) in 1963, the Government of Malaysia decided to amalgamate SJAA and SJAB in Malaya, Sabah and Sarawak into one Corporation known as the St. John Ambulance of Malaysia. This was made possible with the passing of the St. John Ambulance of Malaysia (Incorporation) Act 1972 by the Federal Parliament. The Royal Assent was granted on 23 March 1972.

== Leadership and Governance ==
The present leadership and governance structure of SJAM was established following the enactment of St. John Ambulance of Malaysia (Incorporation) Act 1972 (including its subsidiary legislations).

The Yang di-Pertuan Agong is the Royal Patron of SJAM. The appointment is currently held by the reigning monarch, Sultan Ibrahim ibni Sultan Iskandar.

The affairs of SJAM are governed by the St. John Council of Malaysia, presided by the National President and the Deputy National President. By law, the roles are automatically conferred to the Prime Minister of Malaysia and the Minister of Health, Malaysia respectively and, they are respectively held by Dato' Seri Anwar Ibrahim and Dr. Dzulkefly Ahmad at present. Membership of the Council consists of principal officers of SJAM, representatives from various Federal ministries and agencies, as well as individuals of high standing who are independent.

Day-to-day management affairs rests with the Commander-in-Chief, who is also the Chairman of Council.

== Organisational structure ==
SJAM is headed by a Commander-in-Chief. Appointed by the National President, he is responsible to the Council as the chief executive of the Corporation, assisted by a Deputy Commander-in-Chief. The appointment of Commander-in-Chief is currently held by Dato' Lai See Ming, KStJ whereas his deputy is Dato' Seri Dr Chee Hong Leong.

SJAM has two main areas of activity, as follows:

- Operations: SJAM provides volunteer first aid services at events and emergencies. In metropolitan areas, SJAM provides emergency medical assistance service through a combination of paid staff and volunteers. As the service wing of SJAM, the Operations Wing is responsible for the training, development and management of volunteers in first aid and pre-hospital care. The Operations Wing at the National Headquarters is headed by Dato' Mah Weng Kwai.
- Training:: SJAM is a leading first aid training provider in Malaysia. The Training Wing offers a wide range of training programme on first aid and advanced topics to the public besides providing technical assistance to support the training and development needs and quality assessments of the Operations Wing. The Training Wing at the National Headquarters is headed by Dr. Shah Jahan bin Mohd Yusoff, Chief-of-Staff (Training).

The SJAM National Headquarters, in Kuala Lumpur, oversees the activities of SJAM in the whole of Malaysia. The organisation is then divided into 14 States/Region, each having their own State/Regional Headquarters. With the exception of the State of Perlis and Region of Wilayah Persekutuan (Federal Territory, consisting the cities of Kuala Lumpur and Putrajaya), all other states are divided into Areas (each with an Area Headquarters) to smoothen the coordination process amongst Divisions and the State Headquarters due to geographical factors. Grassroots volunteers are grouped into Divisions.

With the exception of a handful of paid staff, all other personnel in SJAM, including the principal officers at the National Headquarters, are volunteers.

== Membership ==
Membership in SJAM is open to all individuals of good character, good physique and medically fit between 17 and 65 years of age. SJAM accepts suitable and interested individuals from all walks of life but passing the Basic First Aid examination is a pre-requisite before an individual is recognised as having attained the minimum competency to be a uniformed volunteer. First aid training and induction courses are provided to all prospective volunteers free of charge.

SJAM is led by volunteers appointed to functional roles. While all new volunteers would usually be admitted at the basic rank of Ambulance Member (male) or Nursing Member (female), a higher rank may be subsequently assigned, as appropriate, based on respective functional appointments to describe a formal grade within the organisation conferring authority.

=== Skills ===
Volunteers are provided with progressive training and re-training opportunities and can complete a number of first aid qualifications. Training for basic to intermediate skill sets are usually provided at Divisional-level, whereas training for additional and enhanced skills such as ambulance driving and handling, management of mass-casualty incidents, as well as the use of an automated external defibrillator ("AED") are centrally conducted by suitable qualified trainers at the State/Regional Headquarters or Area Headquarters.

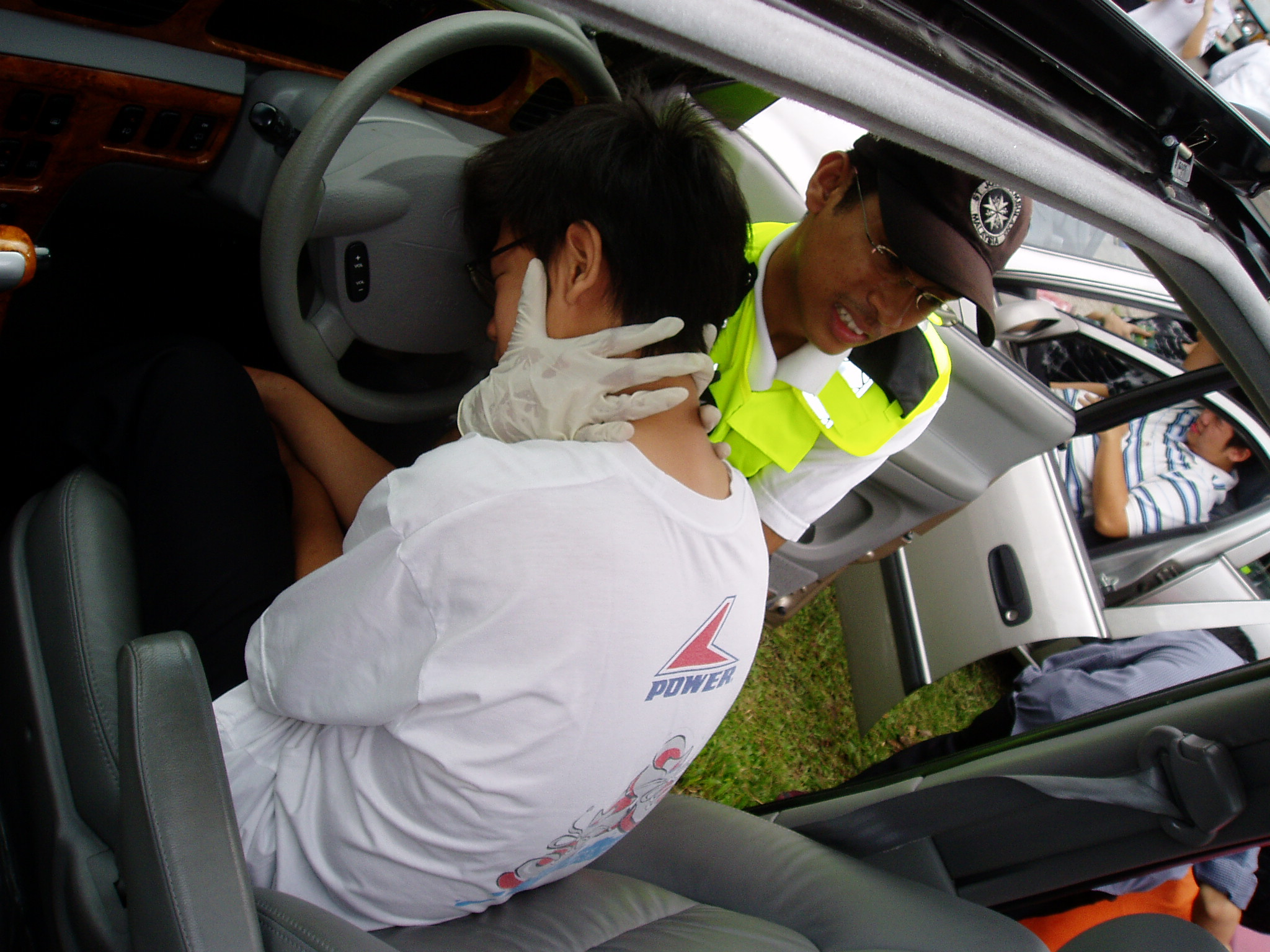
Moulage - Motor Vehicle Accident

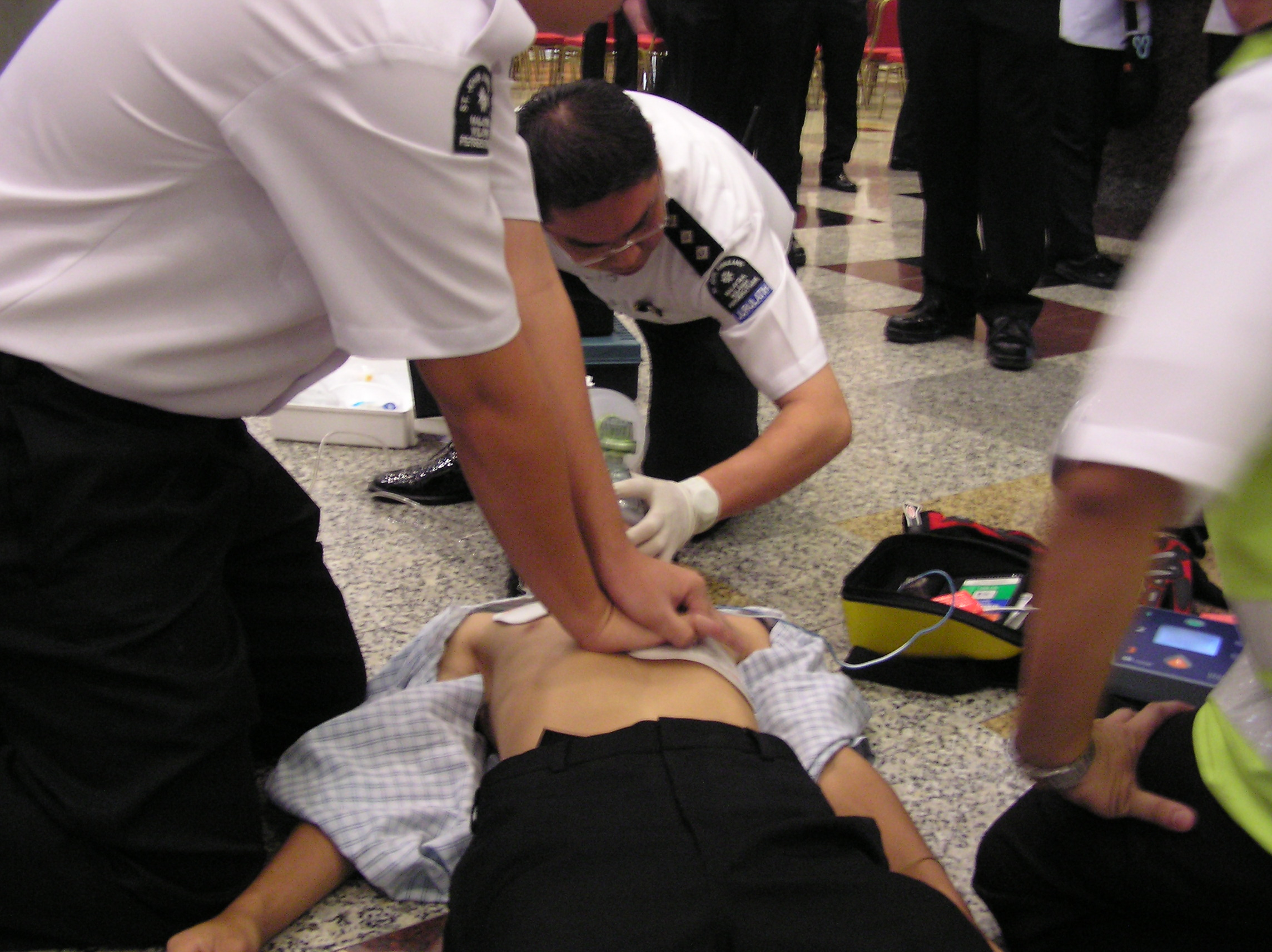
CPR and the use of AED

=== Healthcare Professionals ===
Whilst the majority of volunteers in SJAM are non-healthcare professionals, SJAM welcomes the involvement of healthcare professionals such as Medical Practitioners, Paramedics, Nurses and Medical Assistants to volunteer. Unlike the rest, healthcare professionals do not require to demonstrate their competency through attaining first aid certificates, but their qualifications and professional status are checked with the appropriate regulatory body before admission to SJAM. Healthcare professionals are required for tasks appropriate to their technical competencies during operational duties, as well as training for other volunteers in certain enhanced skills.

=== Developing Human Capital ===
Suitably experienced volunteers, upon demonstrating outstanding competency in Advanced First Aid, may be chosen to be developed as First Aid Trainers. Chosen candidates will undergo development, exposure and assessment in methodology of training before being accredited as First Aid Trainers. Volunteers with such accreditation are entrusted to facilitate training and re-training activities for other volunteers, as well as first aid courses for the public.

Relevant training activities targeting on management, administration and leadership are also provided to volunteers appointed to functional roles. Many volunteers argued that their experience in SJAM, coupled with such exposures, have somewhat given an edge to their career.

== Operations Wing ==
Consistent with its motto and objectives, SJAM offers a wide range of first aid and pre-hospital care services to the public through its Operations Wing, mostly provided free of charge.

=== Public Duty ===
SJAM volunteers attend thousands of events across the country every year, covering a variety of public events such as marathons and other sporting events, parades, public gatherings, and concerts, providing first aid to the sick and injured. Such service is provided free at the point of delivery, although a charge may be levied on the event organiser for attendance at commercial events. The provision of services during public duties are not limited to first aid; ambulances are provided in most events for rapid transportation. Where necessary, SJAM may also provide healthcare professionals to provide assistance at mobile treatment centres.

SJAM has also successfully experimented the use of bicycles to maximise on efficiency and effectiveness during public duties involving a larger area of coverage. SJAM currently has two Cycle Response Units in Kuala Lumpur and Penang, staff by the volunteers of SJAM Wilayah Persekutuan and SJAM Penang respectively.

Due to its commendable and consistent track record, SJAM has also been deployed to render aid to the sick and wounded in many difficult situations; more recently, the Bersih rallies in 2007, 2011 and 2012, as well as the HINDRAF Rally in 2007, all occurred in Kuala Lumpur. SJAM volunteers have acted professionally and neutrally, and provided relief without any distinction of race, class, colour or creed.

=== Transport Duty ===
SJAM is certified by the Malaysian Book of Records as the voluntary organisation with the largest fleet of ambulances in Malaysia. All ambulances are commissioned for active transport duties of the following nature:

==== Emergency Medical Assistance Service ("EMAS") ====
SJAM provides support to the Ministry of Health's statutory ambulance service in metropolitan areas, responding to 999 calls and assisting during times of major incidents. From its humble beginning in Kuala Lumpur and greater Klang Valley on 10 September 1998, EMAS has now been extended statewide in Selangor and Penang, and selected cities and towns in Kedah, Perak, Johor and Sabah.

SJAM was the first in Malaysia to introduce the use of AED in 2001 - it began when all EMAS ambulances in Kuala Lumpur, operated by SJAM Wilayah Persekutuan, were fitted with an AED each.

==== Expressway Emergency Ambulance Service ====
Motor vehicle accidents rate is significantly higher during major festivities due to the balik kampung (home return) rush. Many incidents along the expressways and highways became fatal due to delays in pre-hospital care. Since 1996, SJAM began stationing ambulances and volunteers at strategic locations along expressways and major highways during major festivities as one of its efforts to ensure quicker response to such incidents.

==== Non-emergency Transport Service ====
The large fleet of ambulances is also used in the provision of non-emergency transport service, transferring patients with limited mobility and/or requiring care during the journey to every part of the country, as well as into neighbouring countries (Singapore and Thailand), where land crossing permits.

=== Emergency Medical Air Rescue Service ("EMARS") ===
Since 2010, SJAM has been partnering the Air Unit of the Royal Malaysian Police ("RMP") in providing EMARS. Based at Simpang Airport near downtown Kuala Lumpur, the RMP helicopters are capable of being converted into air ambulances where necessary, and during EMARS deployment, specially-trained SJAM volunteers are assigned to provide patient care on board.

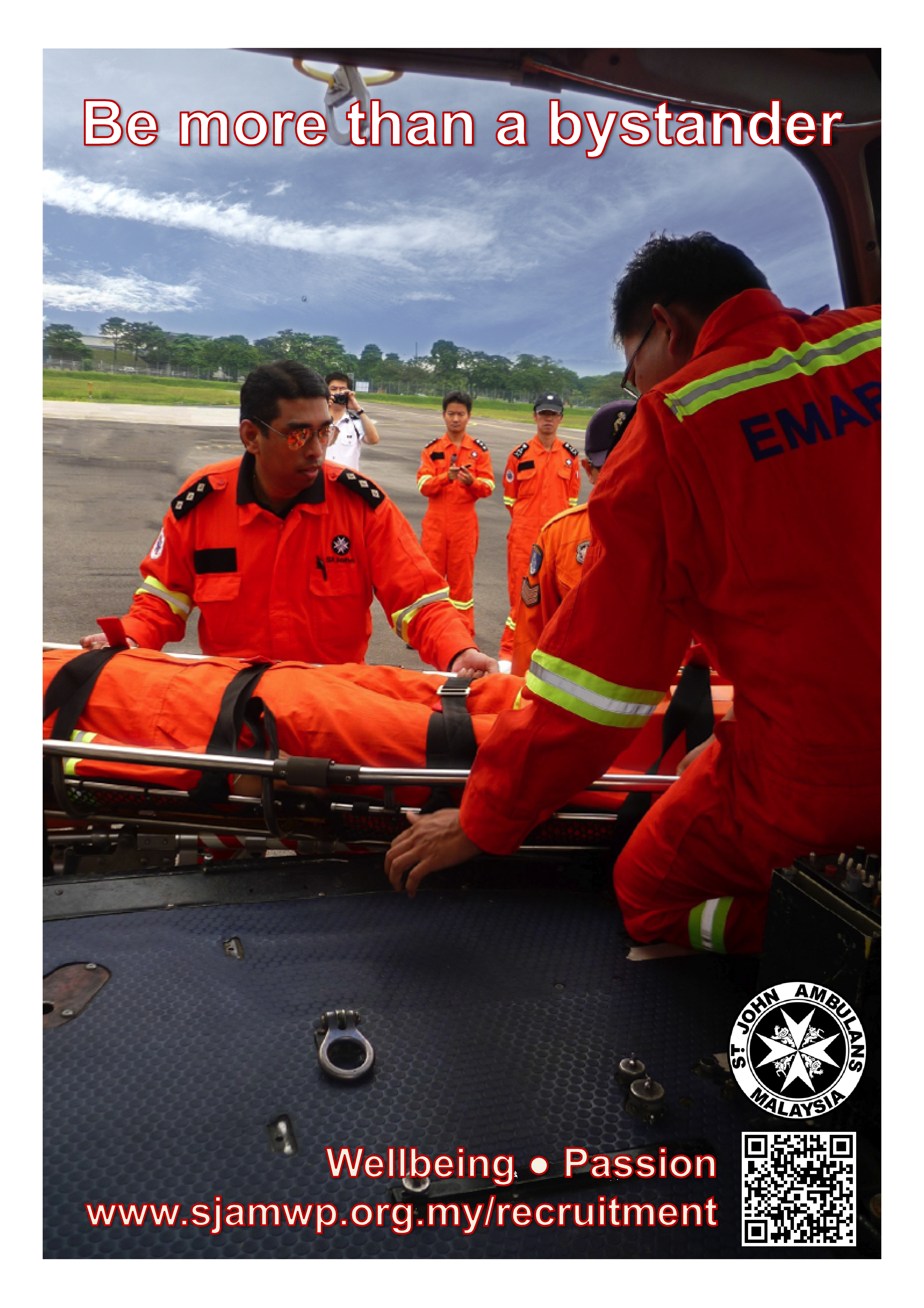
A poster created for the 2012 recruitment campaign of SJAM Wilayah Persekutuan in Kuala Lumpur and Putrajaya, featuring the Emergency Medical Air Rescue Service

== Training Wing ==
The services of Training Wing is 2-prong. Besides providing support to the Operations Wing through the formulation of curriculum and provision of technical training/assessment, the Training Wing is also responsible in addressing the first aid learning and education needs of the public.

=== External Courses ===
SJAM runs first aid courses for external individuals and organisations in return for a modest fee. SJAM has assisted many commercial establishments in training their employees as first aiders based on the popular First Aid at Work syllabus.

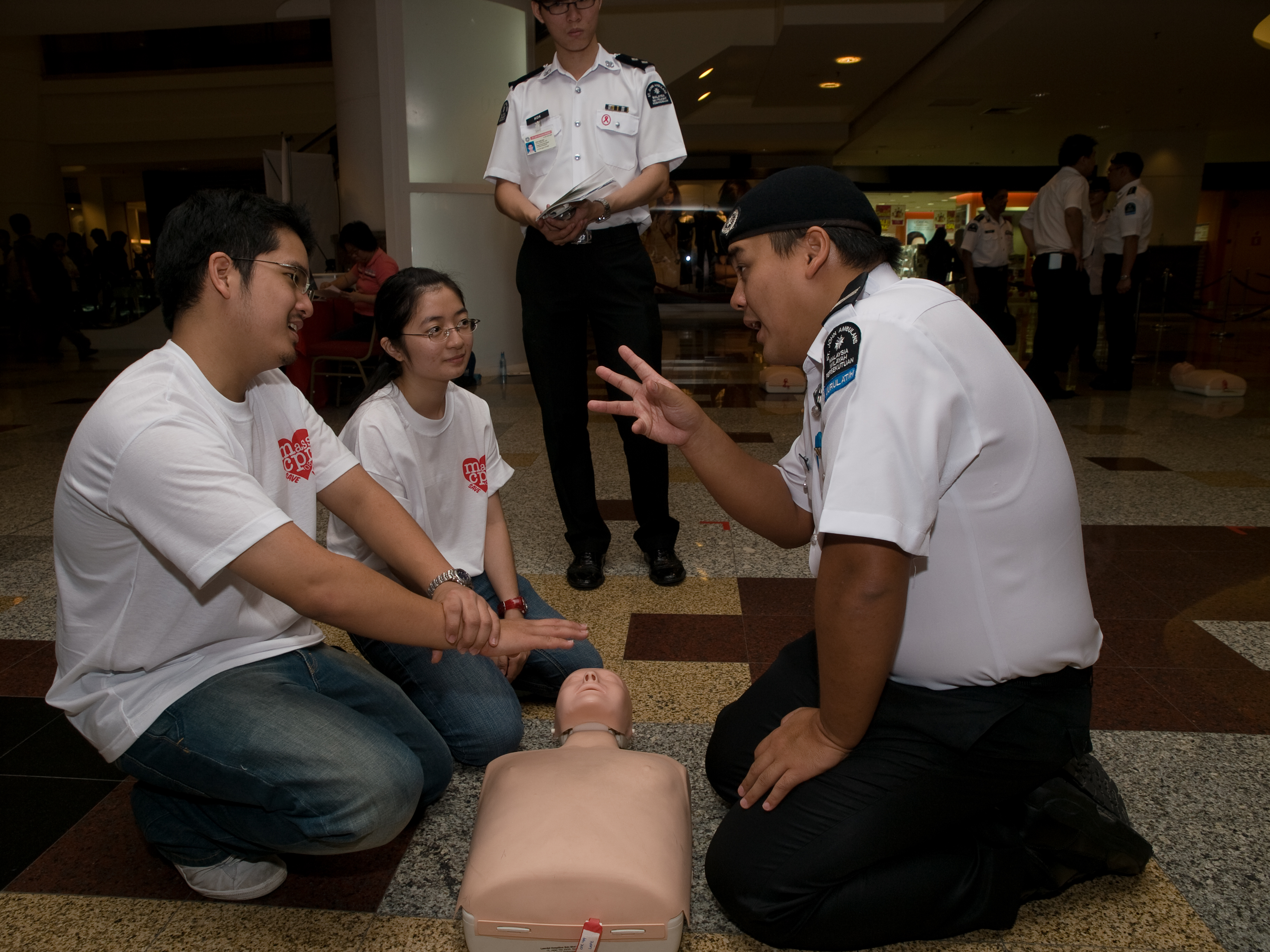
Reach-out efforts such as Mass CPR are made from time to time to create greater awareness amongst members of the public

=== Diploma in Pre-Hospital Emergency Care ===
SJAM, in collaboration with the Open University Malaysia ("OUM") contemplates to develop a 3-year Diploma programme in pre-hospital emergency care using the blended pedagogy of face-to-face learning, online participation of learners to interact with tutors and their peers, self learning through a module and relevant materials in OUM's Tan Sri Abdullah Sanusi Digital Library and attachments at SJAM's EMAS in various parts in Malaysia as well as in hospitals. This programme, recognised by the Malaysian Quality Agency and the Ministry of Higher Education, is designed to address the acute and urgent need to develop a sophisticated pre-hospital care system in Malaysia to upgrade knowledge and skills of emergency medical technicians. The first intake for this programme took place in mid-2010.

=== Capacity Building ===
Among the initiatives of the Training Wing in support of capacity building efforts in pre-hospital care systems in Malaysia are as follows:

==== SJAM Academy ====
SJAM also owns and manages an in-house Clinical Skill Lab, branded as SJAM Academy. Located in Cheras, Kuala Lumpur, the Clinical Skill Lab is fitted with state-of-the-art facilities to facilitate training in pre-hospital care, and is predominantly used for the SJAM-OUM Diploma in Pre-Hospital Emergency Care programme and advanced training for volunteers. The opening of SJAM Academy was officiated by Professor Anthony Roger Mellows, Lord Prior of the Venerable Order of Saint John on 13 January 2012.

==== National Open Pre-Hospital Care Competition ====
SJAM also promotes continuous learning through healthy competitions of knowledge and skills between pre-hospital care providers in Malaysia. The biennial National Open Pre-Hospital Care Competition is a relatively new initiative championed by SJAM to bring together pre-hospital care providers, both paid personnel and volunteers, from all over the country to compete in a scenario-based competition. The winners of Tuan RS Gurcharan Singh Challenge Trophy since the inaugural competition in 2009 are as follows:

- 2009: St John Ambulance of Malaysia (Kuala Lumpur Bukit Bintang Combined Adult Division, Wilayah Persekutuan)
- 2011: Hospital Pulau Pinang (Accident and Emergency Department)

== Other Services to the Community ==
Besides the main areas of services, SJAM also provides various services to the community; some are specific to local needs. Among them:

- Haemodialysis Service: SJAM operates a total of 18 Haemodialysis Centres across the country, providing affordable services to patients with renal failure from the underprivileged group in various parts of Selangor, Malacca, Penang, Perak, Pahang and Sarawak.
- Geriatric Care: SJAM runs a Nursing Home for the Elderly in Taiping, Perak.
- Free Medical Consultation: SJAM operates a clinic which operates for 3 hours on selected Sundays at Bandar Hilir, Malacca, providing free medical consultation to the underprivileged.

== Rank Insignia ==
Ranks and Insignia of St John Ambulance (Senior officers)
Rank	RP	R01	R02	R03	R04	R05	R06	R07
Insignia								
Role	National Royal Patron	* National President	** Deputy National President	Commander-in-Chief	Deputy Commander-in-Chief	Chief-of-Staff; * State Patron	Hon. Secretary-General, Chief Medical Officer, Chief Superintendent; * Regional/State President, ** Deputy Regional/State President, Regional/State Commander	Hon. National Treasurer, Dep. Chief Medical Officer, Chief Nursing Officer, Principal Staff Officer, Chief Officer for Cadets; ** Regional/State VP, Deputy Regional/State Commander; * Area Patron

Ranks and Insignia of St John Ambulance (Officers)
Rank	R08	R09	R10	R11	R12	R13
Insignia						
Role	National Staff Officer (I); Regional/State Medical Officer, Regional/State Superintendent; * Area President, ** Deputy Area President, Area Commander	National Staff Officer (II); Regional/State Hon. Secretary, Regional/State Hon. Treasurer, Regional/State Nursing Officer, Regional/State Staff Officer; ** Vice Area President, Area Medical Officer, Deputy Area Commander, Area Superintendent	National Staff Officer (III); Regional/State Staff Officer; Area Hon. Secretary, Area Area Treasurer, Area Staff Officer, Area Nursing Officer; * Corps President, ** Deputy Corps President, Corps Superintendent, Corps Medical Officer; * School Principal	National Staff Officer (IV); Regional/State Staff Officer; Area Staff Officer; Corps Staff Officer; * Divisional President, ** Divisional Deputy President, Divisional Medical Officer, * Vice Principal (CCA), Divisional Superintendent	National Staff Officer (V); Regional/State Staff Officer; Area Staff Officer; Corps Staff Officer; ** Divisional VP, Divisional Medical Officer, Divisional Officer, Divisional Nursing Officer	National Staff Officer (VI); Regional/State Staff Officer; Area Staff Officer; Corps Staff Officer; Junior Divisional Officer

* Gold bar ** Silver bar
Senior Officer R8 to RP
Intermediate Officer R9 to R10
Junior Officer R11 to R13
CCA: co-curricular activities

Ranks and Insignia of St John Ambulance (Warrant officers)
Rank	National Sergeant-Major	State Sergeant-Major	Area Sergeant-Major I	Area Sergeant-Major II; Corps Sergeant-Major
Insignia				
Role				

Ranks and Insignia of St John Ambulance (Non-Commissioned Officers (NCOs) / Other Ranks)
Rank	Staff Sergeant	Sergeant	Corporal	Lance Corporal	Adult Member
Insignia					
Role					

== SJAM Uniform ==
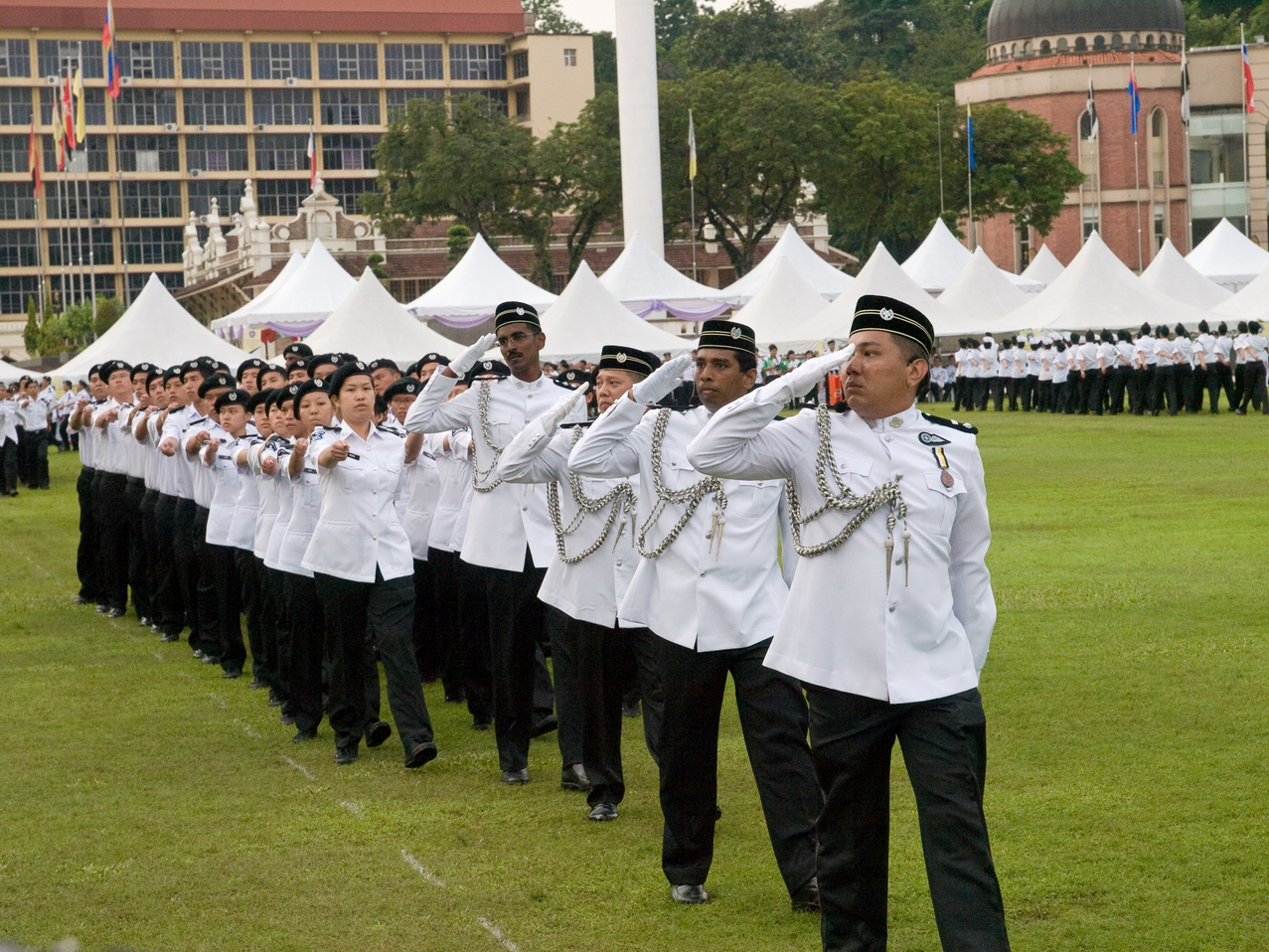
Officers in Uniform A during a ceremonial parade at Merdeka Square, Kuala Lumpur

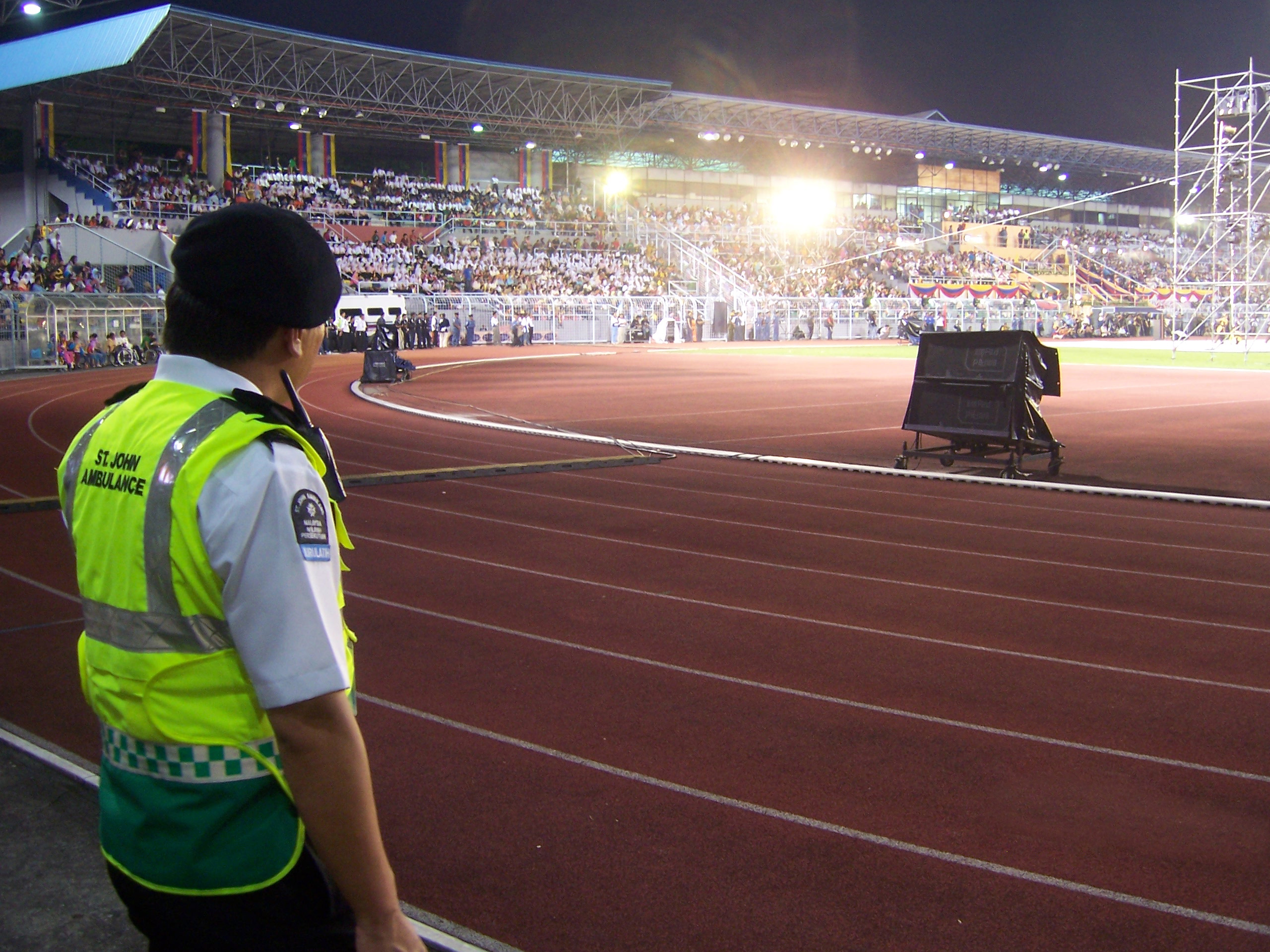
High visibility reflective vest is often worn over Uniform B during duties for increased visibility and ease of identification, particularly at night

With traditions and customs inherited from the SJAB, SJAM is somewhat paramilitary in its protocol and image and hence, SJAM volunteers is recognisable by its distinct white-and-black uniform. Volunteers are required to wear uniform to provide services, both for identification and to present a professional image. Unlike the uniform of other volunteer organisations in Malaysia, SJAM uniform is protected by the law, and may only be worn by volunteers who have been certified to have at least the minimum competency to be a uniformed personnel.

Presently there are six orders of dress intended for different situations:

- Uniform A: Ceremonial Order, an elaborate uniform worn during ceremonial occasions only.
- Uniform B: Service Order, an operational uniform suitable for all types of duties, as well as parades and formations. B1 - Male Service White, B2 - Female Service White, B3 - Service Green, B4 - Service Orange
- Uniform C: Mess Order, an evening dress worn at formal occasions.
- Uniform D: Cadet and Junior Service Order, an evening dress worn at formal occasions. D1 - Male Service White, D2 - Female Service White.
- Uniform E: Leisure Wear, a polo shirt serves as default attire for outdoor and physical activities.
- Uniform F: Corporate Order, a unisex uniform B3 for operational purpose.

Uniform B is the most widely used among the six. Yellow/green two-tone high visibility garments are sometimes worn over Uniform B for outdoor events for safety and ease of identification. For Officers, there are two variants of Uniform B. Beret is worn during operational duties and field parade events only, whereas Peaked Cap (male) or Bowler's Hat (female) are used in Uniform B in events other than operational duties.

For training and informal events, Training Order (consisting green-white/white SJAM polo T-shirt and black trousers similar to Uniform E) is worn. On rare occasions (subject to waiver instructions), Training Order is also used for operational duties, but it is usually invoked during disasters which requires rapid mobilisation and deployment of volunteers, or when long hours of stand-by is required or expected.

While Officers are expected to maintain all of the orders of dress as discussed above, Uniforms A and C remain optional to the members of other ranks (Staff Sergeant and below).

== SJAM Cadets ==
SJAM Cadets is the youth section of SJAM for young people aged between 10 and 17 years (inclusive). The history of SJAM Cadets could be traced to the formation of the first ambulance cadet division of SJAB in Penang back in 1938. Since then, it has grown to be one of the biggest youth activities in Malaysia. Cadet divisions can be found in most secondary schools as an extracurricular activity, where cadets take part in a wide variety of activities - providing first aid at community events, participating in first aid competitions, completing awards, attending camps and learning leadership skills.

SJAM is an affiliate of the Malaysian Youth Council.

=== Cadet Awards ===
There are two award schemes that cadets can achieve during their time at SJAM Cadets, as follows:

==== Cadet Proficiency Badge Scheme - Grand Prior's Award ====
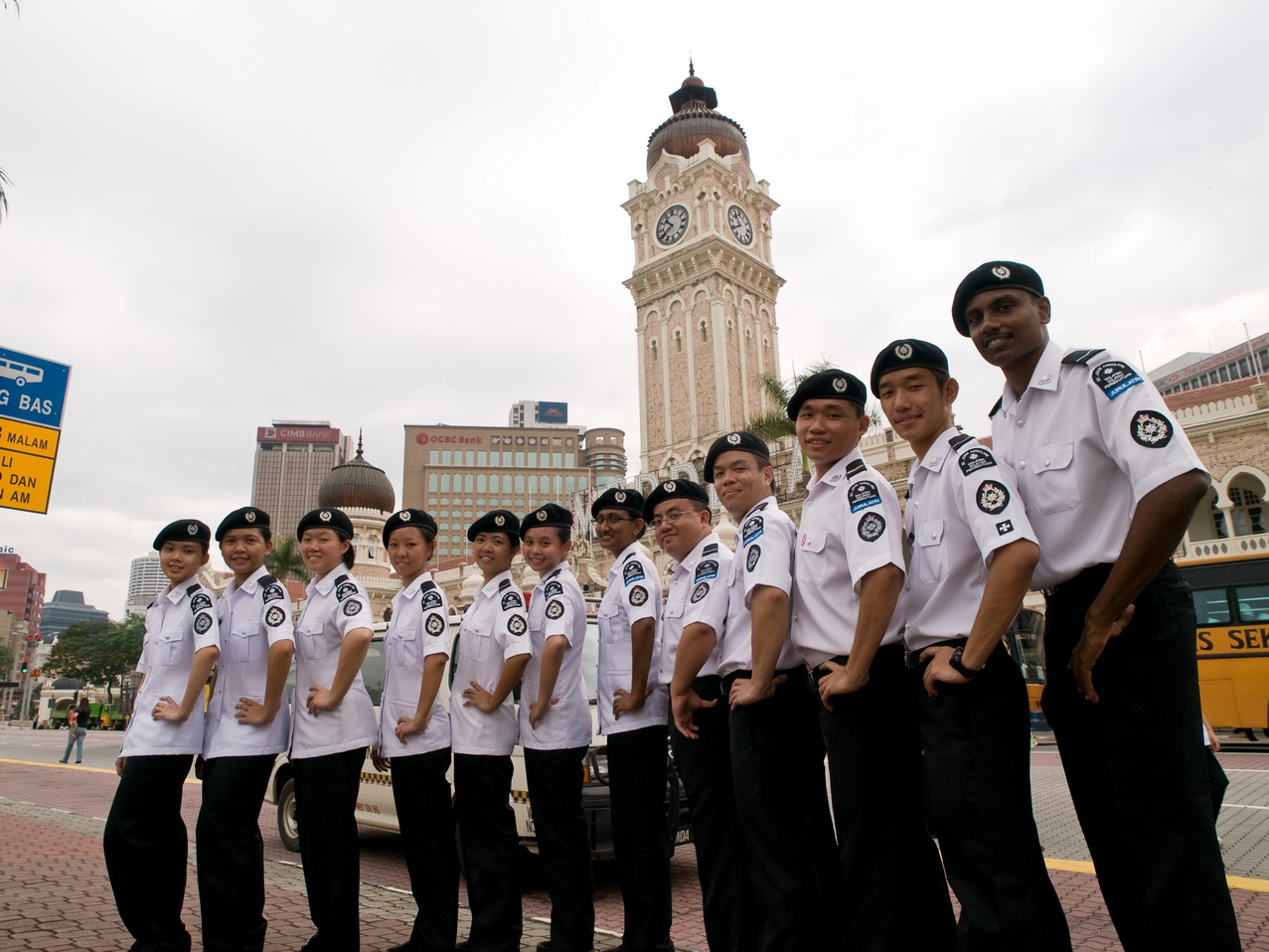
The Grand Prior's Award badge is worn on the left sleeve. Full members of SJAM whom have been conferred the Grand Prior's Award during their membership in SJAM Cadets are allowed to retain the badge on the uniform throughout their entire service.

The Grand Prior's Award, named after the Grand Prior of the Venerable Order of Saint John, is the highest award a cadet can achieve. The Cadet Proficiency Badge Scheme involves cadets completing twelve subjects over a period not less than three years to encourage them to take an interest in subjects outside their normal curricula and widen their horizons by carrying out these studies in their leisure time. Beyond SJAM Cadets, a recipient of the Grand Prior's Award is allowed to retain the Grand Prior's Award badge on the uniform if he or she chooses to advance within the organisation.

==== Cadet Voluntary Service Scheme - Special Service Shield ====
The Special Service Shield is awarded to cadets to encourage them to undertake duties and services which benefit the community on voluntary basis. The first badge is awarded upon completing a minimum of 100 hours of service; further badges are awarded for 200, 500, 750 and ultimately, 1000 hours of service. The badge for 1000 hours of service may be retained on the uniform if the recipient chooses to advance within the organisation.

=== Cadet Rank Insignia ===
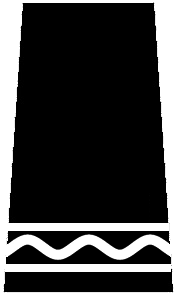
Cadet Leader

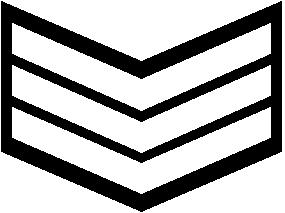
Cadet Sergeant

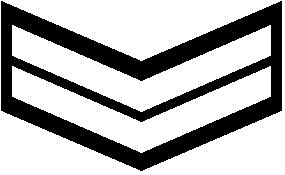
Cadet Corporal

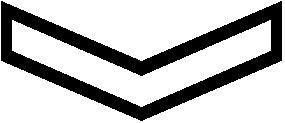
Cadet Lance Corporal

== Awards and honours ==
=== Local awards ===
Ribbon	Name (English/Malay)	Category	Instituted	Awarded to/for
	Eminent Order of Loyalty; Darjah Setia Utama	1	1997	This award shall be conferred on Officers of Rank 6 and above and on individuals of the highest standing in society who have contributed excellent and outstanding service. The recipient of this award should possess influential, noble and respectable status in society. This award is limited to 15 living persons.
	Order of Supreme Merit; Darjah Bakti Perkasa	2	1997	This award shall be conferred on Officers of Rank 8 and above and on individuals who enjoy a high status in society and have contributed excellent service. This award is limited to 30 living persons. This Category 2 award consists of a ribbon in SJAM colours with a Bakti Perkasa badge hung at the end of the collarette. This award is worn around the neck. On Duty uniform, a ribbon consists of SJAM colours and two gold stars and is worn above the left pocket.
	Meritorious Service Medal; Pingat Jasa Gemilang	3	1997	This award shall be conferred on Officers of Rank 10 and above and on individuals who have contributed unique and valuable service.
	Outstanding Service Medal; Pingat Jasa Cemerlang	4	1997	This award shall be conferred on Officers of Rank 12 and above and on individuals who have contributed outstanding service.
	Distinguished Service Medal; Pingat Jasa Terpuji	5	1997	This award shall be conferred on Officers and individuals who have exhibited competence or praiseworthy deeds. The recipient must possess good character and good conduct.
	Life Saving Medal; Pingat Gagah Berani	Gold	1874	The Life Saving Medal was instituted in 1874 to enable the Order to honour those who saved, or attempted to save the life of another and who placed themselves at imminent personal risk in doing so. It is not necessary to have performed first aid.
	Life Saving Medal; Pingat Gagah Berani	Silver	1874	The Life Saving Medal was instituted in 1874 to enable the Order to honour those who saved, or attempted to save the life of another and who placed themselves at imminent personal risk in doing so. It is not necessary to have performed first aid.
	Life Saving Medal; Pingat Gagah Berani	Bronze	1874	The Life Saving Medal was instituted in 1874 to enable the Order to honour those who saved, or attempted to save the life of another and who placed themselves at imminent personal risk in doing so. It is not necessary to have performed first aid.
Gold Silver	Centenary Medal; Pingat Peringatan Ulang Tahun Ke-100	Gold	2008	SJAM commemorates its one hundred years in Malaysia by issuing SJAM Centenary Medals to all qualified officers, members and members of the public who have made significant contributions to the organisation. The SJAM Centenary Medal is issued as a gold or silver medal.
Gold Silver	Centenary Medal; Pingat Peringatan Ulang Tahun Ke-100	Silver	2008	SJAM commemorates its one hundred years in Malaysia by issuing SJAM Centenary Medals to all qualified officers, members and members of the public who have made significant contributions to the organisation. The SJAM Centenary Medal is issued as a gold or silver medal.
Gold Silver	Centenary Medal; Pingat Peringatan Ulang Tahun Ke-100	Bronze	2008	SJAM commemorates its one hundred years in Malaysia by issuing SJAM Centenary Medals to all qualified officers, members and members of the public who have made significant contributions to the organisation. The SJAM Centenary Medal is issued as a gold or silver medal.
	111th Anniversary Commemorative Medal; Pingat Peringatan Ulang Tahun Ke-111		2019	SJAM commemorates its 111 years in Malaysia by issuing SJAM Centenary Medals to all qualified officers, members and members of the public who have made significant contributions to the organisation for at least three years.
	Five Years Service Medal; Pingat Perkhidmatan Lima Tahun		2004	In 2004, the National St. John Council of Malaysia introduced the Five Years Service Medal to recognise members and officers who have performed efficiently for at least five years. This medal was introduced in recognition of the efficient service of SJAM members and officers who have been diligently discharging their duties. This award precedes the Service Medal of the Order of St. John, which is awarded for ten years active and efficient service.
	Commander-in-Chief's Award; Anugerah Pemerintah Agung		2003	The Commander-in-Chief's Award is presented by the Commander-in-Chief to individuals and entities who exhibit outstanding qualities and who have given remarkable service to SJAM.

=== International Awards (awarded by the Order of St John) ===
1. Most Venerable Order of the Hospital of Saint John of Jerusalem
  1. The Bailiff / Dame Grand Cross of the Order of St John (GCStJ)
  2. The Knights / Dame of Justice of the Order of St John (KStJ / DStJ)
  3. The Knights / Dame of Grace of the Order of St John (KStJ / DStJ)
  4. The Commander of the Order of St John (CStJ)
  5. The Officer of the Order of St John (OStJ)
  6. The Member of the Order of St John (MStJ)
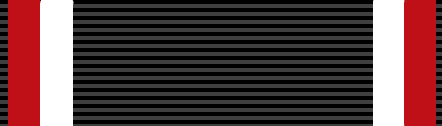
2. The Life-Saving Medal of the Order of St John*
3. Service Medal of the Order of St John
4. Ultra Long Service Extension of the Service Medal of the Order of St John

*To be worn on the right chest.

== See also ==
- St. John Ambulance
- Venerable Order of Saint John
