= St John Ambulance Cymru =

First aid organisation in Wales

- Logo of St John Ambulance Cymru
- Founded: 1877
- Type: Charitable organisation Limited company
- Purpose: First aid, medical care, humanitarian relief, youth programmes
- Location(s): Priory House, Beignon Close, Ocean Way, Cardiff, Wales
- Region served: Wales
- Services: First aid training, medical transport, first aid supplies
- Prior and Chair of the Board: Paul Griffiths OBE KStJ DL
- Chancellor and Vice Chair of the Board: Caryn Cox DStJ DL
- Priory Dean: Rev Canon Alan Pierce-Jones
- Board of directors: Emily Bristow OStJ; Helen Willson MStJ; James O'Connor OStJ; Dr Jean White CBE MStJ; Rhys Jenkins OStJ; Dr Marc Penny MStJ; Carol Jones MStJ; Nyah Lowe; Catherine Evans; Hadley Newman MStJ; Prof Nigel Rees QAM
- Volunteers: Adult - 1,250+; Youth - 773; (2024)
- Website: www.sjacymru.org.uk

St John Ambulance Cymru (previously known as St John Cymru-Wales, officially known as The Priory for Wales of the Most Venerable Order of the Hospital of St John of Jerusalem) is a charity in Wales (Welsh: Cymru) dedicated to the teaching and practice of first aid. It is part of the Order of Saint John and operates as the Welsh branch of St John Ambulance.

== History ==
The medieval Order of St John is the original inspiration of the modern Most Venerable Order of the Hospital of St John of Jerusalem. As part of its charitable work, the order founded three separate charities in the nineteenth century. One was an eye hospital in Jerusalem. The other two were the St John Ambulance Association (1877) and the St John Ambulance Brigade (1887) providing, respectively, first aid and nursing training, and first aid and nursing work by trained volunteers. The two organisations merged around a hundred years later into the single St John Ambulance organisation.

In 1907, King Edward VII, as Sovereign Head of the order, authorised the foundation of different 'priories' of the order for different nations. The first to be founded was the Priory of Wales (1918), which in turn led to St John Ambulance in Wales becoming a separate organisation and charity from the English parent body.

On 2 April 2020, St John Cymru-Wales was rebranded to St John Ambulance Cymru.

== Services ==
St John Ambulance Cymru provides a mix of paid and free first aid cover at events, free to patients at the point of delivery. It uses trained volunteer first aiders as well as paramedics, doctors, nurses, and other registered healthcare professionals, aided by mobile treatment centres, ambulances and other medical provisions.

In addition to event medical services, the charity provides patient transport services, youth programmes, community first aid education and mental health first aid training throughout Wales.

The organisation covers major events across Wales including the National Eisteddfod, the Cardiff Half Marathon, Principality Stadium events, Liberty Stadium events, Ironman Wales as well as smaller and charitable events such as fetes and local fairs. St John Ambulance Cymru volunteers provide community emergency response, work alongside the Welsh Ambulance Service.

=== Scale and Operation ===
As of 2024, St John Ambulance Cymru had more than 1,250 adult volunteers and 773 young people participating through its Cadet and Badger programmes. The organisation provides medical cover at approximately 1,000 events annually across Wales and delivers first aid training to more than 25,000 members of the public each year. According to filings with the Charity Commission, the charity reported income of £8.0 million and expenditure of £8.7 million for the year ending 31 December 2024.

=== Workplace training ===
St John Ambulance Cymru also teaches training courses at its training centres across Wales. It offers courses across first aid, health & safety, and mental health. In the UK, St John Ambulance it is recognised by the Health and Safety Executive to provide first aid training in accordance with the Health and Safety (First Aid) Regulations 1981. Proceeds from the training help to fund the organisation's charity work.

=== Community Campaigns ===
St John Ambulance Cymru runs an annual public-awareness campaign known as "Defibruary", which promotes cardiopulmonary resuscitation (CPR) training and public access defibrillator awareness. The campaign includes demonstrations in schools, community venues and workplaces across Wales.

In 2025, the organisation donated eight retired ambulance vehicles and medical equipment for frontline medical use in Ukraine.

== Structure ==
St John Ambulance Cymru is organised into seven county regions:

- Cardiff and the Vale
- Dyfed
- Gwent
- Mid Glamorgan
- North Wales
- Powys
- West Glamorgan

Each county region is further sub-divided into operational divisions.

== See also ==
- Service Medal of the Order of St John
- St John Ambulance
