= St John Youth New Zealand =

Cadet programme in New Zealand

- St John Youth logo
- Affiliated With: Hato Hone St John
- Youth members: 3,049 as of 26 January 2026
- Chief Executive: Peter Bradley CBE
- National Youth Manager: Kerry Mitchell JP
- Notable Youth Awards: Sovereign's Award and Grand Prior’s Award

Hato Hone St John Youth is a cadet-based programme for young people aged between five and eighteen. Members who turn eighteen tend to remain involved in leadership roles. St John Youth is closely affiliated with the Order of St John in New Zealand, of which Charles III is the Sovereign Head. St John Youth consists of two programmes; the Penguin Programme is for children in school years 0–6, and the Cadet Programme is for young people in school years 7–13. The Youth curriculum focuses on leadership, life skills, first aid, and fun, as well as other unique aspects only to New Zealand and military-style drill.

== Regions ==
St John Youth is divided into three regions (Northern Region, Central Region and South Island Region) around New Zealand; each has a Regional Youth Manager, Regional Cadet of the Year (RCOTY) and Deputy Regional Cadet of the year (DRCOTY). The organisation is also led by the National Youth Manager, Youth Strategic Development Manager, and National Cadet of the Year (NCOTY).

Cadets of the Year (District [x24], Deputy Regional [x3], Regional [x3], and National [x1]) represent the interests of young people at all levels of the programme, from District Youth Leadership Teams to Priory Chapter. For the duration of their one year term, DCOTYs wear blue fourragères; DRCOTYs wear silver fourragères; RCOTYs wear white aiguillettes; and the NCOTY wears a gold aiguillette.

For 2025, they are:

National Youth Manager (NYM)	Youth Strategic Development Manager (NYSDM)	National Cadet of The Year (NCOTY)
Kerry Mitchell CStJ JP	Rebekah Van Leeuwen MStJ (Currently Daniel McDowall MStJ until mid 2027)	Zara Campbell

Region	Regional Youth Manager (RYM)	Regional Cadet of The Year (RCOTY)	Deputy Regional Cadet of The Year (DRCOTY)
Northern Region	Anastasia Tinsel MStJ	Bella Tinsel	Cooper Galt
Central Region	Daniel McDowall MStJ (Currently Bee Lewis-Jones until mid 2027)	Abbey Clark	Abbey Clark
South Island Region	Lynda Walter OStJ	Nate Woods	Cassandra Garnett

== Grand Prior's Award Scheme ==
The Grand Prior's Award is among the highest achievements available for St John Youth members. In order to earn the Grand Prior's Award, cadets must achieve the 5 compulsory badges (shown below) plus 5 other optional badges (all at Gold level), Level 2 First Aid (15+), and an additional 100 community service hours.

=== Proficiency Badges ===
New Curriculum
Badge Name	Compulsory For Grand Prior?
Adventures	No
Casualty Simulation	No
Child Development	No
Community Engagement	No
Drill and Ceremonies	Yes
Emergency Management	No
Environment	No
Global Citizenship	No
Healthcare	Yes
Hauora	Yes
Innovation	No
Life Skills	Yes
Safety	No
St John	Yes

Badge Achievements
Hoiho/Korora	Picture	Blue	Picture	Gold	Picture
Super Hoiho		Sapphire Shield		Grand Prior	
Super Korora		Sapphire Shield		Grand Prior	

Old Curriculum
Badge Name	Badge Image	Compulsory for Grand Prior?
Accident Prevention		No
Animal Care		No
Camping		No
Caregivers		Yes
Casualty Simulation		No
Child Care		No
Civil Defense		No
Communication		Yes
Community Awareness		Yes
Drill		Yes
Environment		No
Faith	(Current) (Old)	No
Fire Safety		No
First Aid		Yes
Fitness		No
Global Citizenship		No
Hauora (Health)		No
Hobbies		No
Home Technology		No
IT (Information Technology)		No
Kiwiana		No
Leadership		No
Maoritanga		No
Media Studies		No
Road Safety		No
St John		Yes
The Arts		No
Ventureship		No
Water Safety		No

== Ranks ==
Ranks and Insignia of St John New Zealand Cadets
Rank	Cadet Leader	Cadet Sergeant	Cadet Corporal	Cadet
Insignia				
Notes	A Cadet Leader is the highest possible NCO rank a Youth Member can achieve. Cadet Leaders have the benefit of having this rank until the age of 18–19.	Second highest NCO rank in St John Youth.	The first NCO rank in St John Youth. Ranks are earned by undergoing Youth Leadership Development Training.	The first "rank" given to Cadets in St John Youth. This rank is only given to those of the Blue group and above.

== Competitions ==
Competitions are held regularly throughout the year, with tests on trauma, medical, improvisation (no first aid kits), Communication, Drill, Pairs 1&2, Pairs 3&4 and a Team Leader Test Divisions can enter teams of up to two competitors for Kororā (Yr1 to Yr3), Hoiho (Yr4 to Yr6), Intermediate (Blue) (Yr7 to Yr9) and Senior (Gold) (Yr10 to Yr13 or until you turn 19) competition teams. In senior competitions, there is also the senior individual category which is made up of one senior cadet who participates in a Trauma, Medical, Improvisation, Communication and Drill Test. (The drill test is done with a Senior Team)
All three regions hold District Competitions where the top teams and individuals then progress through to the Regional Competitions.

Both Northern and Central regions compete annually at Interprovincial Competitions. To qualify to go to Interprovincial Competitions, teams must be in the top 6 scorers in the Quiz test, held either as the Communications test at district competitions or held at a separate date closer to the competition. Additionally, both regions send 6 teams to Interprovincials from either the Quiz test and an 7th guest team can be sent by the hosting region (it switches between northern and central every year).

=== National Youth Festival/Competitions ===
Previously known as the National Youth Competitions, the National Youth Festival is an annual event held in different regions every year. This is a competition where every region across New Zealand meet for competitions which are often held in April.

The previous competition was held by South Island Region in Christchurch. All regions run a process to select their squads that will represent their region at competitions. Each region has a different process and must select a regional squad that consists of four teams of four, four individuals (one to be assigned to each team) and four ‘emergencies’ (also one to be assigned to each team). Phased out in 2020, some Regions selected development squads that don't compete on the day but train with the squad, or as a non-competing emergency.

The Champion Region title is currently held by Central Region (2026).

=== International Youth Festival ===
In 2010 New Zealand hosted an International Youth Festival. Held between 25 and 31 January at Lincoln University near Christchurch. Cadets from 8 other countries (England, Wales, Germany, Canada, Malaysia, Singapore, Hong Kong and Australia) attended the festival, which incorporated both the National and International competitions. The Northern Region South Island (NRSI) (since amalgamated into South Island Region) team won the National Competitions, winning Champion Team, Champion Individual and Champion Region, amongst other trophies. Other activities during the festival included an 'Amazing Puzzle Race' around Christchurch city center, a visit to Hamner Springs and Thrillseekers canyon, a Youth Symposium, in which cadets listened to speakers and discussed issues faced Youth in today's world, a sports championship, surfing and Sightseeing around Christchurch City and the International Antarctic Center.

Every four years, an International Youth Festival is held. The last International Youth Festival was held in South Africa in 2020. The next International Youth Festival is being held in Auckland towards the end of 2027.

== Divisions ==
Each region in Hato Hone St John Youth is made up of "Divisions" in which cadets meet. Divisions usually meet for an hour and a half and once a week. Each Division is run by a Division Manager, Assistant Division Manager, and other volunteer youth leaders.

In New Zealand, the first cadet division was started on 2 May 1927 by Mr Ted Gilberd in Whanganui.

== Child Safeguarding Policy ==
Hato Hone St John Youth has a nationwide Child Protection Policy (CPP), which ensures the safety of its young people.

== Joining Hato Hone St John Youth ==
Those who wish to join Hato Hone St John Youth can contact a Division in their area and then attend a Divisional Meeting. It costs $40 each term the cadet is attending, and a one-off $40 cost to enrol. Competitions, camps, and other activities also will cost extra (price depends on what activity). The sew-on proficiency badges, certificates and badge material are included in the termly fee. For those facing financial hardship, St John has funds available to meet costs in cases of financial hardship.
