= St John Ambulance Cadets (England) =

Youth division of St John Ambulance in England

- The logo of the St John Ambulance Cadets

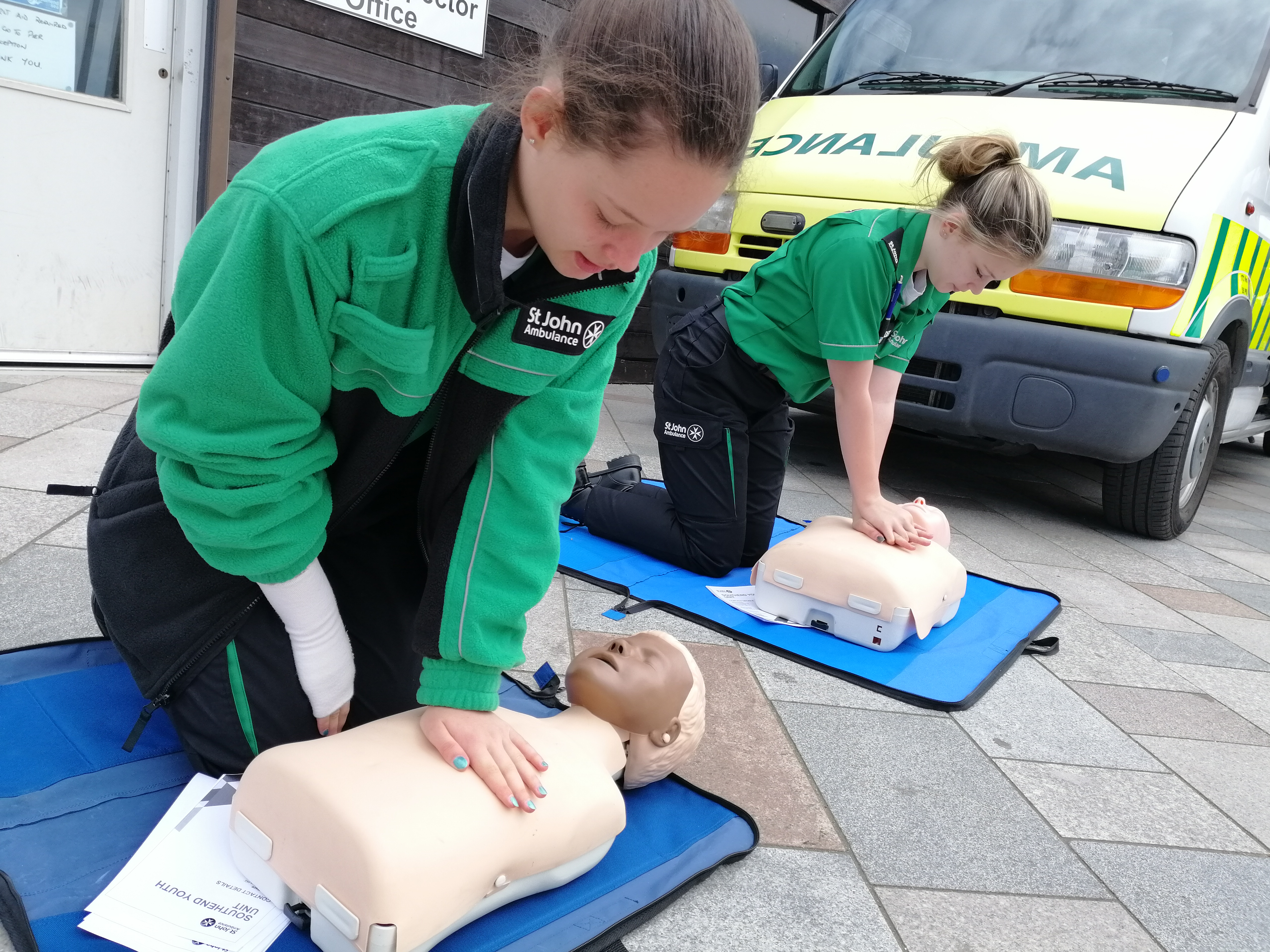
- Two St John Ambulance Cadets performing CPR on a Little Anne; a type of Medical education mannequin
- Formation: March 1922
- Type: Charitable organisation; Youth organisation
- Purpose: First aid education
- Headquarters: 27 St John's Lane, Clerkenwell, London, EC1M 4BU
- Location(s): England and the Islands
- Members: 8,071
- Commandant-in-Chief: HRH The Princess Royal
- Parent organization: St John Ambulance (England)
- Website: www.sja.org.uk/get-involved/young-people/cadets-ages-10-17/

St John Ambulance Cadets is a youth organisation of St John Ambulance founded in England in 1922 for people aged between 10 and 17 to train them in first aid, social actions, wellbeing, communication and other essential skills. As of December 2019, there were 8,071 Cadets in England. Cadets take part in a variety of activities that consist of providing first aid at community events, learning leadership and training skills.

In 2020, the Cadet program was reviewed in which a new program was launched to reflect a more modern approach for young people. This includes the Grand Prior's Award, leadership courses and the development of the first aid courses provided. The program had been under design since 2017 and was an inclusive process including youth leaders from all four regions of the priory in England, St John Ambulance Wales, cadets from across the four regions and other stakeholders.

== Training ==
- First Aid – there are two first aid courses: a basic induction "First Aid for Cadets", an introductory 10-hour course to providing first aid at events; a "Cadet Operational First Aider" qualification, mimicking the adult first aid role, allowing them to treat under supervision. First aid training is also completed as a module with the Membership Award that all Cadets undertake. They are trained in the use of an Automated external defibrillator (AED) in both courses.
- Cadet Leadership – it is encouraged to attend leadership courses taking place at two levels. They teach skills which enable cadets to be promoted to Cadet Young Leaders (NCOs) with their units. The courses count towards the Cadet's Grand Prior Award.
- Peer Education – completion of this course allows cadets to gain a BTEC Level 2 Certificate in Peer Education, an externally accredited qualification. Following the completion of the qualification, Cadet Peer Educators can give first aid training to young people and teach Grand Prior Award subjects in which they are already competent. Cadets who complete the course but do not gain the qualification can become Cadet Assistant Peer Educator; they cannot solely give first aid training, but can assist their qualified counterparts in training others. This qualification is unavailable because the awarding body responsible withdrew. The Demonstrator and assessor awards have been brought in to replace this and still offer cadets the chance to learn skills to teach others how to do first aid.

== Activities ==
Cadets can take part in a variety of other activities that are not first aid, and assist adult members of St John Ambulance. Some of them are listed below.

- Assisting St John Ambulance adult members while providing first aid at events (e.g. football matches, firework displays, local events).
- Radio communication work.
- Leading and training groups of Cadets.
- Competitions such as "Cadet of the Year".
- Fundraising for St John Ambulance and other charities.
- Completing awards such as the Grand Prior Award and Duke of Edinburgh's Award.
- Taking part in drills; in some areas, the Remembrance Sunday parade.
- Socializing at organised recreation events (e.g. "fun nights", camping, youth balls and other trips).

== Cadet Code of Chivalry ==
As part of their enrolment, cadets pledge a Code of Chivalry, similar to how Scouts make a Scout Promise when they join. Cadets promise to observe the Code of Chivalry and will often recite it on special occasions.

== Awards ==
There are a number of awards that cadets can achieve during their time at St John Ambulance:

- Membership Award ‒ this is the first award that new members will complete, which involves completion of worksheets and activities about various aspects of St John life. Each unit may run this in other ways.
- Grand Prior Award Scheme ‒ this is the highest award a cadet can achieve, named for the Grand Prior of The Order of St John. This award scheme involves Cadets completing 24 subjects at different levels (bronze, silver, gold and Grand). This usually takes about 3– 6 years to complete.
- Service Awards ‒ every time a cadet completes any volunteering for St John Ambulance, their hours are logged. When a certain number of hours are completed, they are awarded a badge (after 50 hours, 100 hours, and every 100 hours up to 1000 hours).
- Other awards ‒ The Duke of Edinburgh's Award can also be completed; St John Ambulance recently recommitted to providing this award for all cadets eligible.

== Cadet roles ==
In 2017‒2018, St John Ambulance reviewed the roles cadets can hold. When the new service delivery uniform (SDU) was introduced, the following role bars were available to achieve with training.

- Cadet Observer (Discontinued)
- Cadet Trainee First Aider (Discontinued)
- Cadet First Aider (Discontinued Changed to Cadet Community First Aider in 2025)
- Cadet Advanced First Aider (Discontinued, Later Reintroduced as Cadet Emergency Responder in 2025)
- Cadet Peer Educator (Discontinued Changed to Demonstrator)
- Cadet Assistant Peer Educator (Discontinued Changed to Demonstrator)

As of 1 January 2018, there are no more Cadet Trainee First Aider courses or Cadet Advanced First Aider courses following a review in mid-2017. The only three cadet clinical roles available as of 2025 are Cadet, Cadet Community First Aider and Cadet Emergency Responder.

Cadets have to be 13 to complete their Cadet Community First Aider Course, allowing them to deliver first aid at events. Cadets and Cadet First Aiders are trained in the use of AEDs.

Cadets who are 16+ can complete their Emergency Responder course, allowing them to deliver advanced first aid, including medical drugs and medical gases. Cadet Emergency Responders hold the exact same skills as an adult Emergency Responder.

Roles of St John Ambulance Cadets
| Role | Cadet Observer (role discontinued - replaced with "Cadet") | Cadet Trainee First Aider (role discontinued) | Cadet Community First Aider |
|---|---|---|---|
| Role bar | | | |

== Rank structure ==
The ranking structure for Cadets is as follows; they can only attain the title of non-commissioned officer (NCO).

Ranks and Insignia of St John Ambulance Cadets
| UK Cadets | Officers | Cadet Senior NCOs | | | | Cadet Junior NCOs | | Cadets | Recruits |
| UK Cadets | CDT 8 | CDT 7 | CDT 6 | CDT 5 | CDT 4 | CDT 3 | CDT2 | CDT1 | CDT (R) |
|---|---|---|---|---|---|---|---|---|---|
| St John Ambulance Cadets ranks and shoulder insignia | No equivalent | Leading Cadets; LCDT | No equivalent | Cadet Sergeant; CdtS | No equivalent | Cadets Corporal; CdtC | No equivalent | Cadets; CDT | No insignia Recruit RcT |

To be promoted to the rank of Cadet Corporal or Sergeant, they must have completed Cadet Leadership 1 training. For promotion to Leading Cadet, completion of Cadet Leadership 2 is essential. Once the leadership course is complete, they may have an interview with a panel usually consisting of the Unit Manager, Youth Leader, and District Youth Officers; some panels may also include a young person representative.

== Uniform ==
Uniform for St John Ambulance Cadets consists of two types - service delivery uniform, and non-clinical uniform.

The Service Delivery Uniform [commonly abbreviated as SDU] is used for operational activity, it's commonly worn when:

- providing first aid in an operational activity
- attending formal events, such as Remembrance Sunday
- taking part in drills

The standard issue to Cadets who have not yet completed their Operational First Aider qualification is a branded black polo shirt and a "Cadet" role bar.

Cadets who are registered as Cadet Operational First Aiders are entitled to SDU, provided by the organisation.

== See also ==
- Cadets (youth program)
