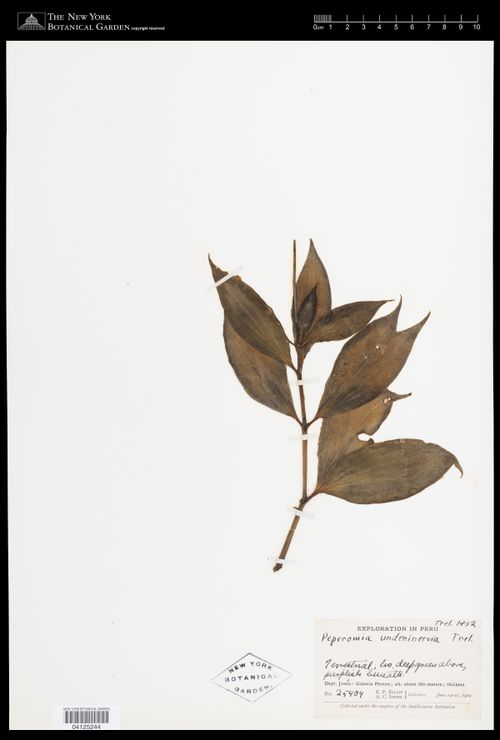

Scientific classification
- Kingdom: Plantae
- Clade: Embryophytes
- Clade: Tracheophytes
- Clade: Angiosperms
- Clade: Magnoliids
- Order: Piperales
- Family: Piperaceae
- Genus: Peperomia
- Species: P. undeninervia

Binomial name
- Peperomia undeninervia C.DC.

= Peperomia undeninervia =

Species of plant

Peperomia undeninervia is a species of epiphyte from the genus Peperomia. It was first described by Casimir de Candolle and published in the book "Prodromus Systematis Naturalis Regni Vegetabilis 16(1): 441. 1869.". It primarily grows on wet tropical biomes.

== Distribution ==
It is endemic to Peru. First specimens were found at an altitude of 1400–1700 in Junín.

- Peru
  - San Martín
    - Mariscal Cáceres
  - Junín
    - Colonia Perene
