= Gran Saposoa =

Ruins in Amazonas, Peru

Coordinates: 6.9568°S 77.5420°W

Gran Saposoa is the name given to a series of ruins in the Andean cloud forests of the Amazonas region of Peru by American explorer Gene Savoy. Savoy hypothesized that this site is the Pre-Columbian city of Cajamarquilla, built by the Chachapoyas culture, but Chachapoyas archaeologists observed that "Cajamarquilla" is clearly identifiable in historical documents as the renamed modern highland town of Bolívar, Peru. Savoy claims that the ruins, consisting of hundreds of round stone structures, cover approximately 120 square miles, and consist of 23,950 structures. However, Gran Saposoa is not a single site, but rather a cluster of separate archaeological sites already located and published by avocational archaeologists Keith Muscutt, 2 and anthropologist Dr. Inge Schjellerup 3 in the mid 1990s. After Savoy announced his 1999 "discovery," and the sizes and populations claimed for Gran Saposoa were exposed as grossly exaggerated by professional archaeologists specializing in Chachapoyas archaeology 4. Archaeologists observed that ruins like Gran Saposoa, and Gran Vilaya "discovered" ten years prior, were long-known to Peruvian area residents and not genuine "discoveries."

In September 2005, Gene’s son Sean Savoy released a statement to the Associated Press indicating that upon a recent return to the archaeological site at Gran Saposoa, the team found the site had been looted. The news raised criticism not only of the Peruvian government for not adequately protecting the site, but also of Savoy and his team for revealing the location of the site and not providing adequate protection on their own. Protection of archaeological ruins remains an issue in Peru, since looters and black market sellers are extremely well financed.

== See also ==
- Gran Pajatén
- History of Peru
