= Edna Jackson =

Edna Jackson may refer to:

- Edna Burke Jackson (1911–2004), American educator
- Edna Jackson (artist) (born 1950), American artist
- Edna Jackson (politician) (born 1944), American politician

== See also ==
- Edna Jackson Carver, American physician
