= 2002 World Monuments Watch =

Nonprofit advocacy program

The World Monuments Watch is a flagship advocacy program of the New York–based private non-profit organization, World Monuments Fund (WMF) that is dedicated to preserving and safeguarding the historic, artistic, and architectural heritage of humankind.

== Selection process ==
Every two years, it publishes a select list known as the Watch List of 100 Most Endangered Sites that is in urgent need of preservation funding and protection. It is a call to action on behalf of threatened cultural heritage monuments worldwide. The sites are nominated by governments, conservation professionals, site caretakers, non-government organizations (NGOs), concerned individuals, and others working in the field. An independent panel of international experts then select 100 candidates from these entries to be part of the Watch List, based on the significance of the sites, the urgency of the threat, and the viability of both advocacy and conservation solutions. A site’s inclusion on the Watch List brings them to international attention, helping to raise funds needed for its rescue and spurring local governments and communities to take an active role in protecting the cultural landmark.

== 2002 Watch List ==
The 2002 World Monuments Watch List of 100 Most Endangered Sites was launched on October 11, 2001, by WMF President Bonnie Burnham at a press conference at the Museum of Modern Art in New York. The Watch List was expanded to 101 in the wake of the devastating destruction of the World Trade Center on September 11, 2001. Its vicinity—the Lower Manhattan area, was added as an imperiled urban site.

The examples highlighted by the list tell tales of human achievements and aspirations. It is a challenge, as well as a source of inspiration, for us to respond to the needs of these sites and the communities they represent.

— Bonnie Burnham, WMF president, launch of 2002 Watch List

=== List by country/territory ===
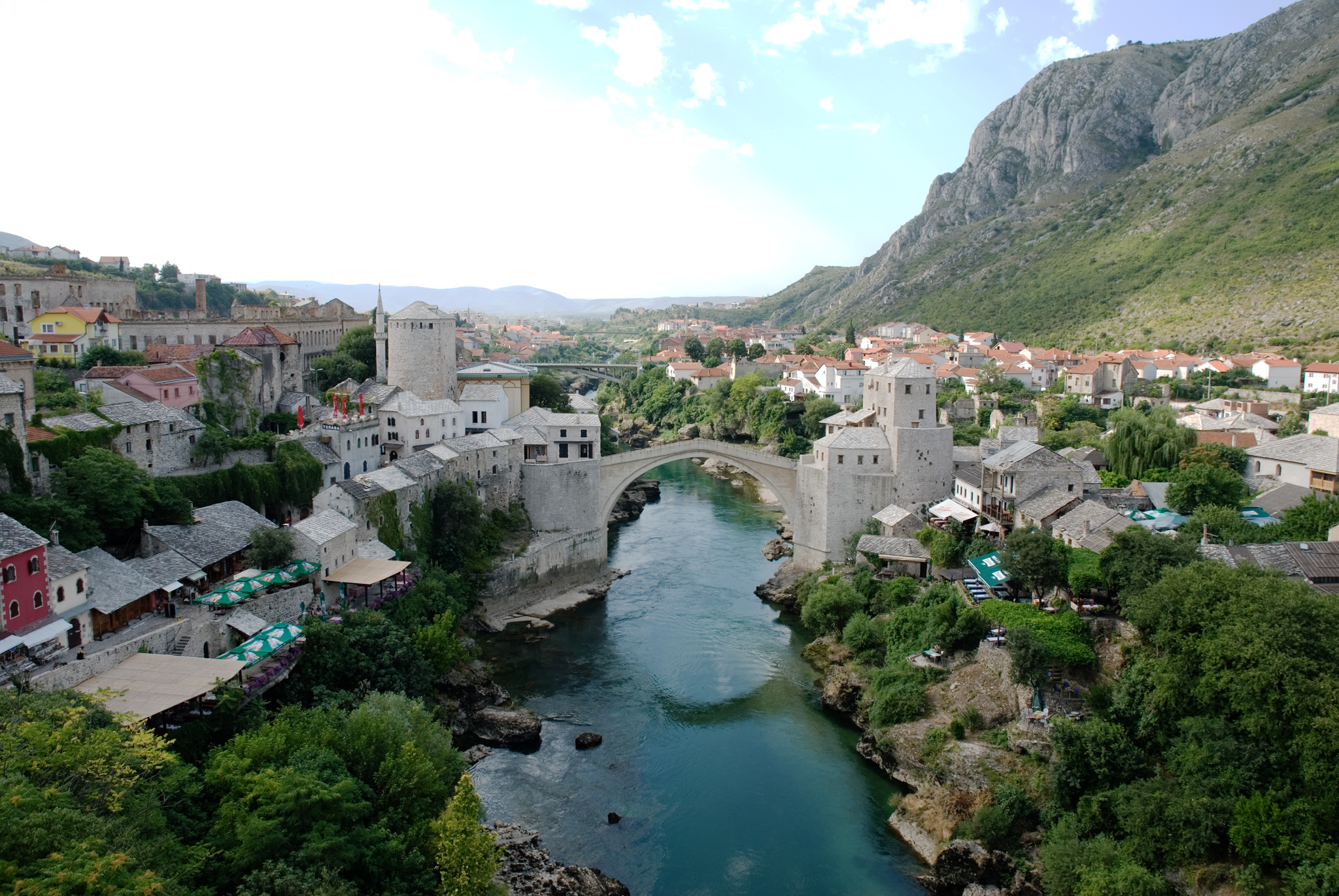
The city of Mostar in Bosnia and Herzegovina contains numerous archetypal examples of historic architectural styles that were largely destroyed by bombardment during the Yugoslav conflict.

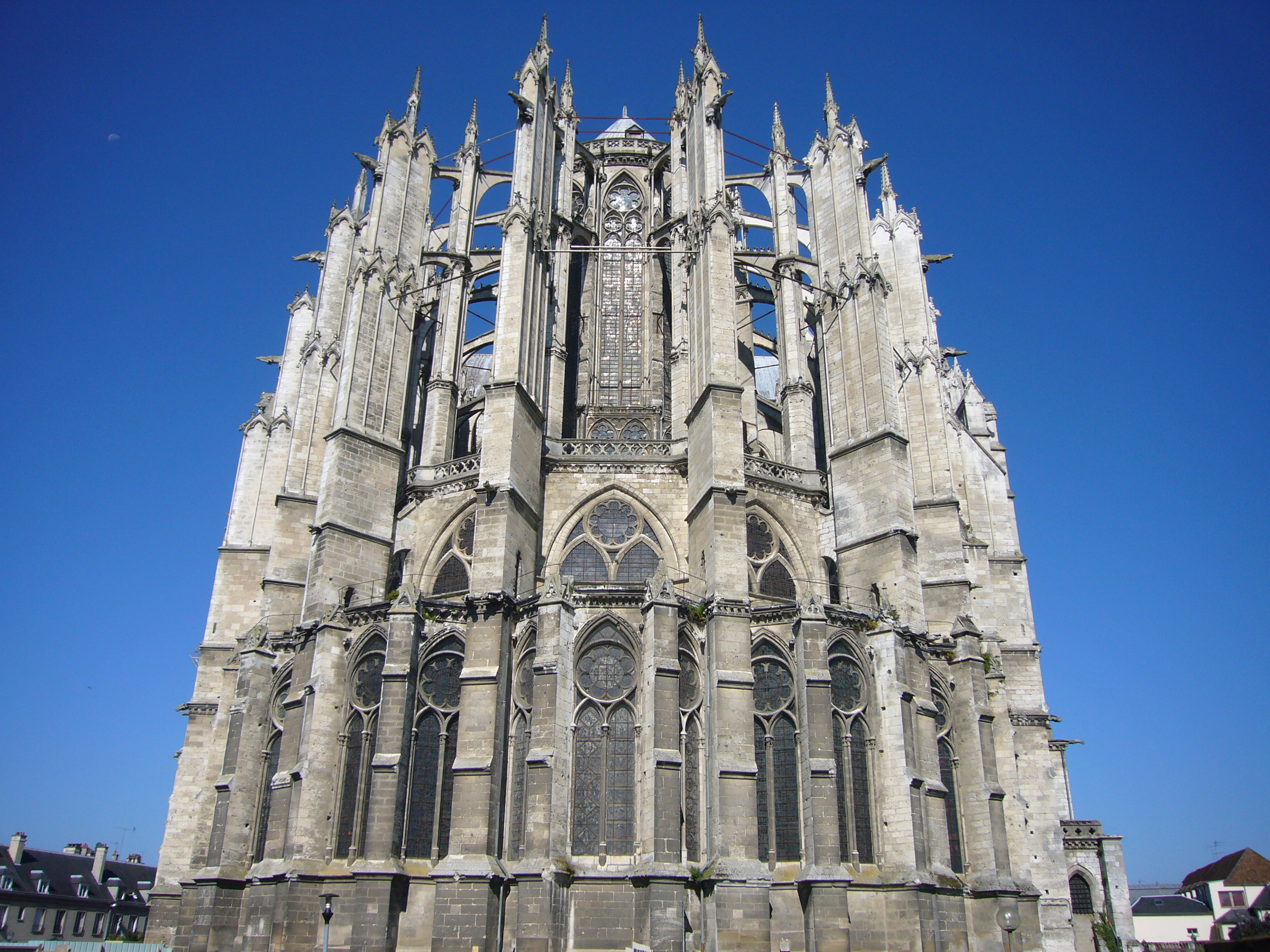
St. Pierre de Beauvais Cathedral is one of the two sites from the Oise locality in France that were included on the 2002 Watch List.

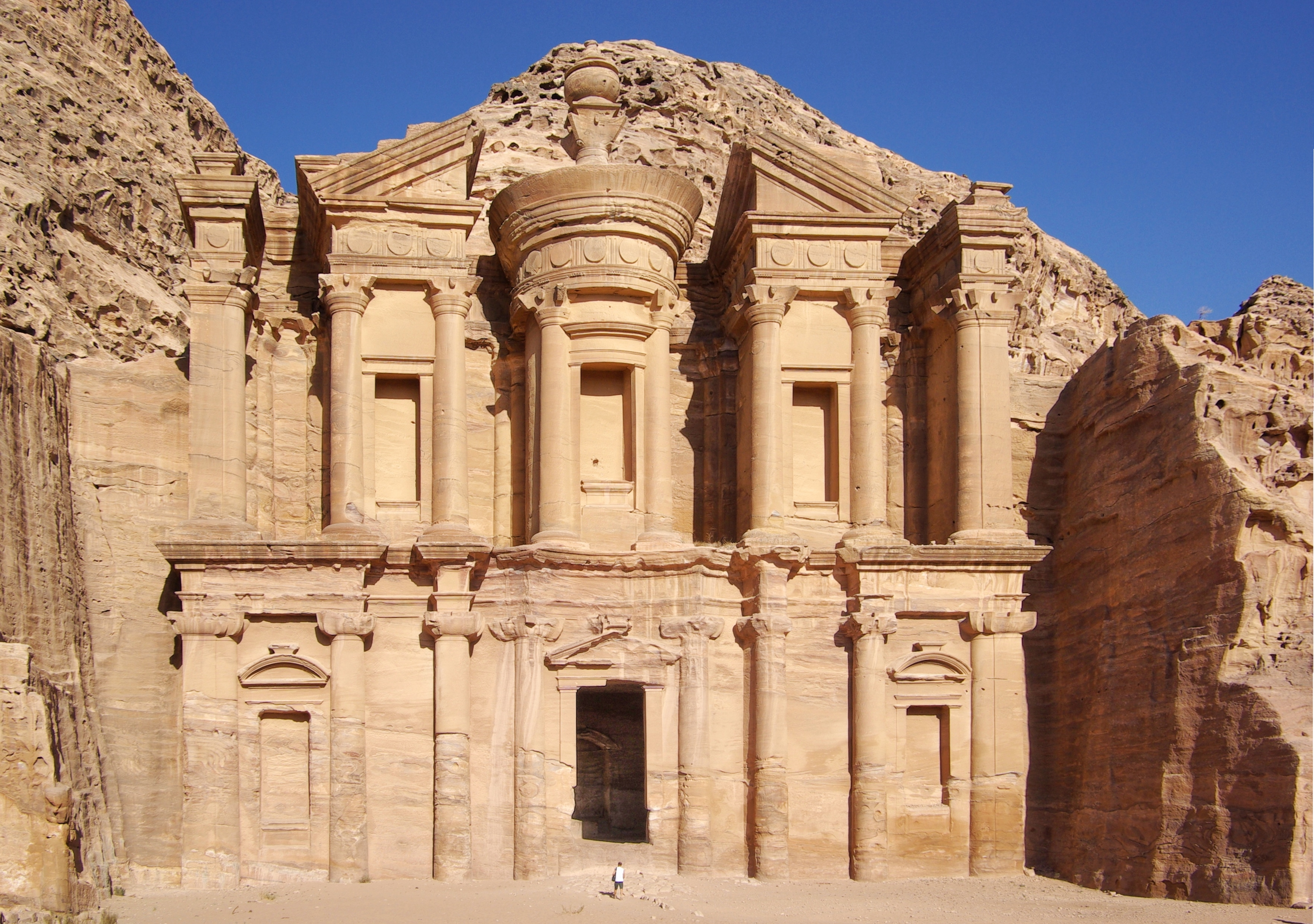
The Jordanian site of Petra, renowned for its rock-cut architecture, was famously described as "a rose-red city half as old as time" in a Newdigate prize-winning poem by John William Burgon.

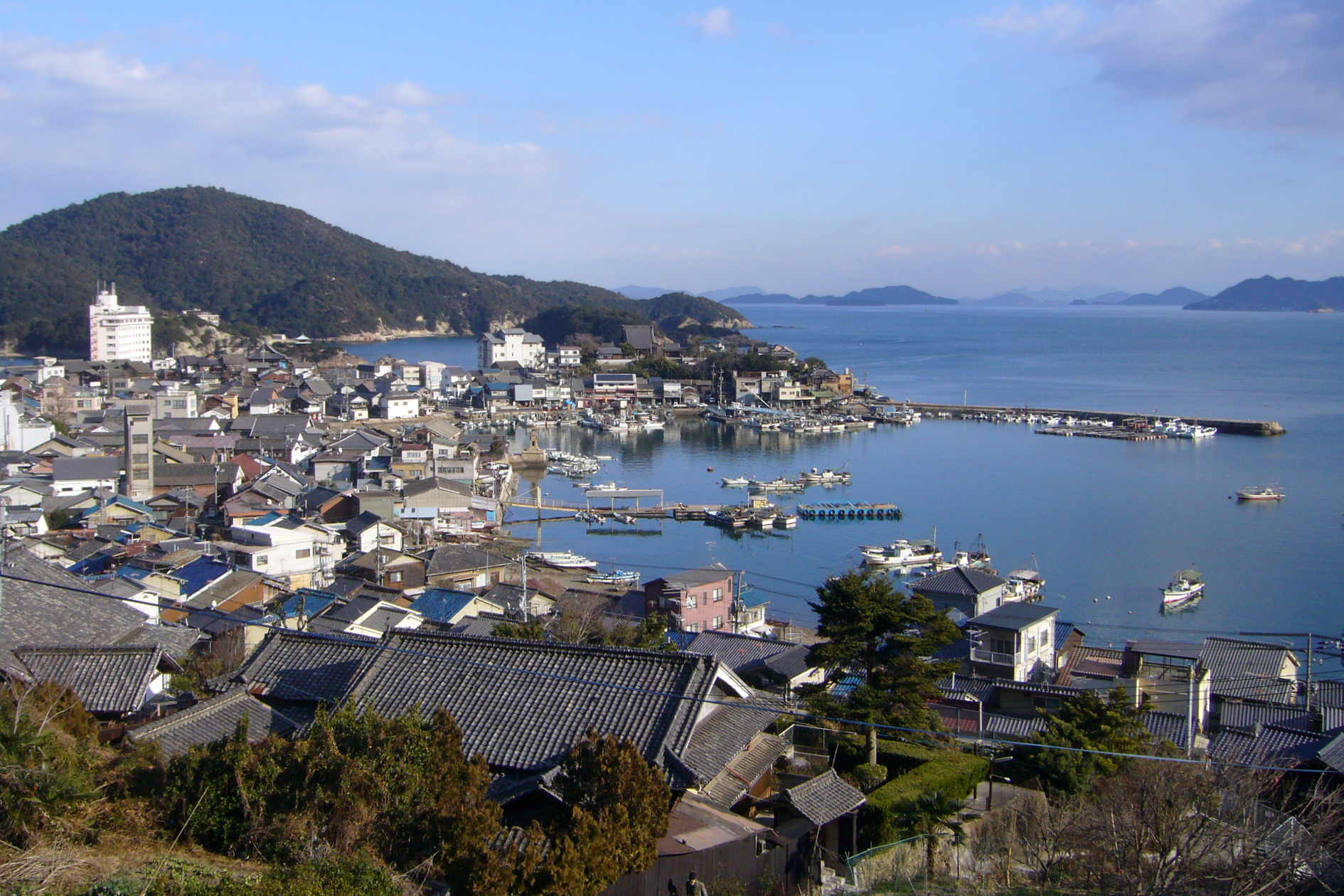
Japan's Tomo port, which dates back to the Edo period, is threatened by the construction of a landfill and bridge that will radically alter its waterfront and increase traffic within the city.

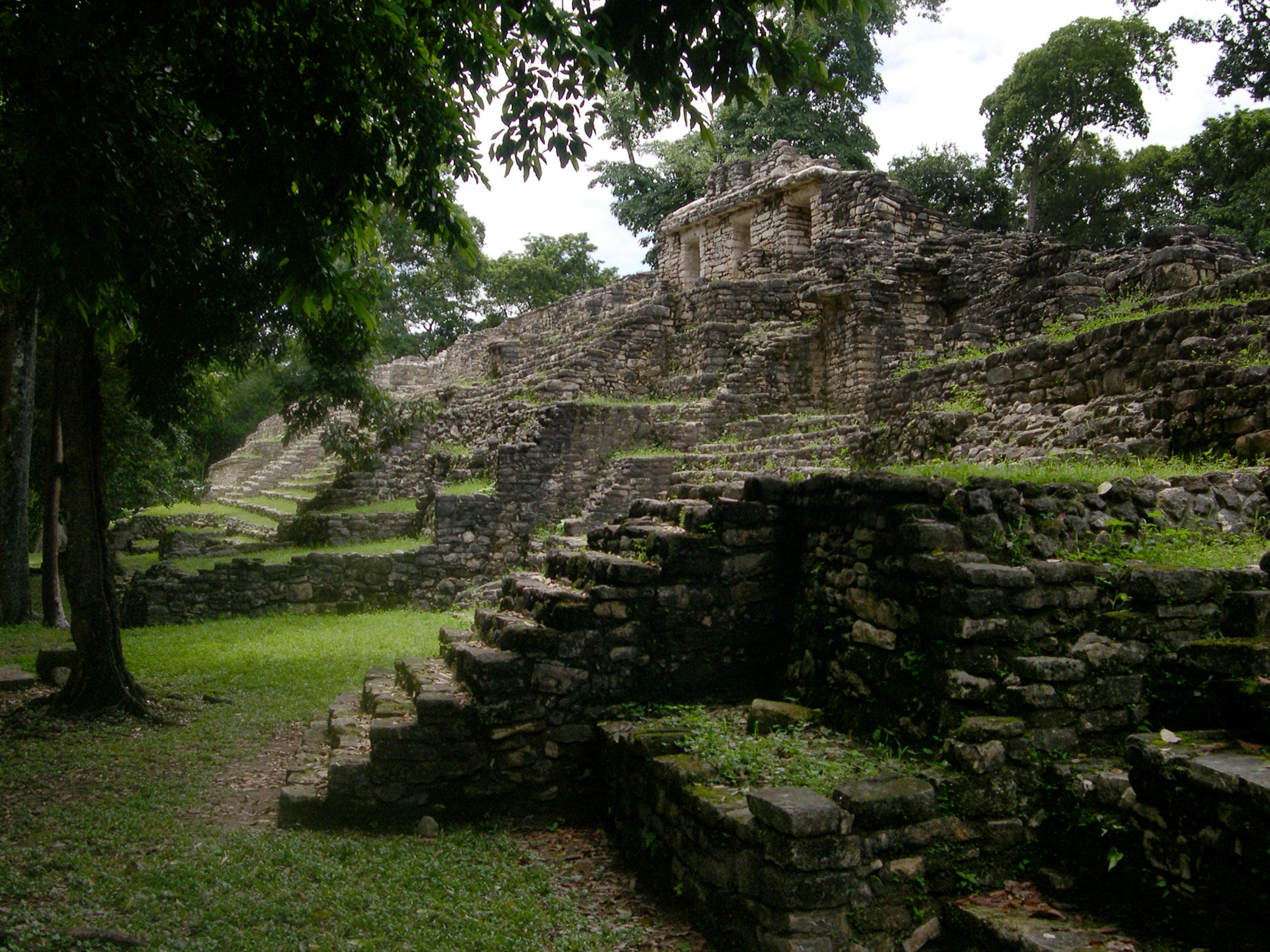
During the Late Classic Period, the ancient Maya city of Yaxchilan, in what is now Mexico, rivaled Piedras Negras as one of the most powerful states along the course of the Usumacinta. Both were archaeological sites were included on the 2002 Watch List.

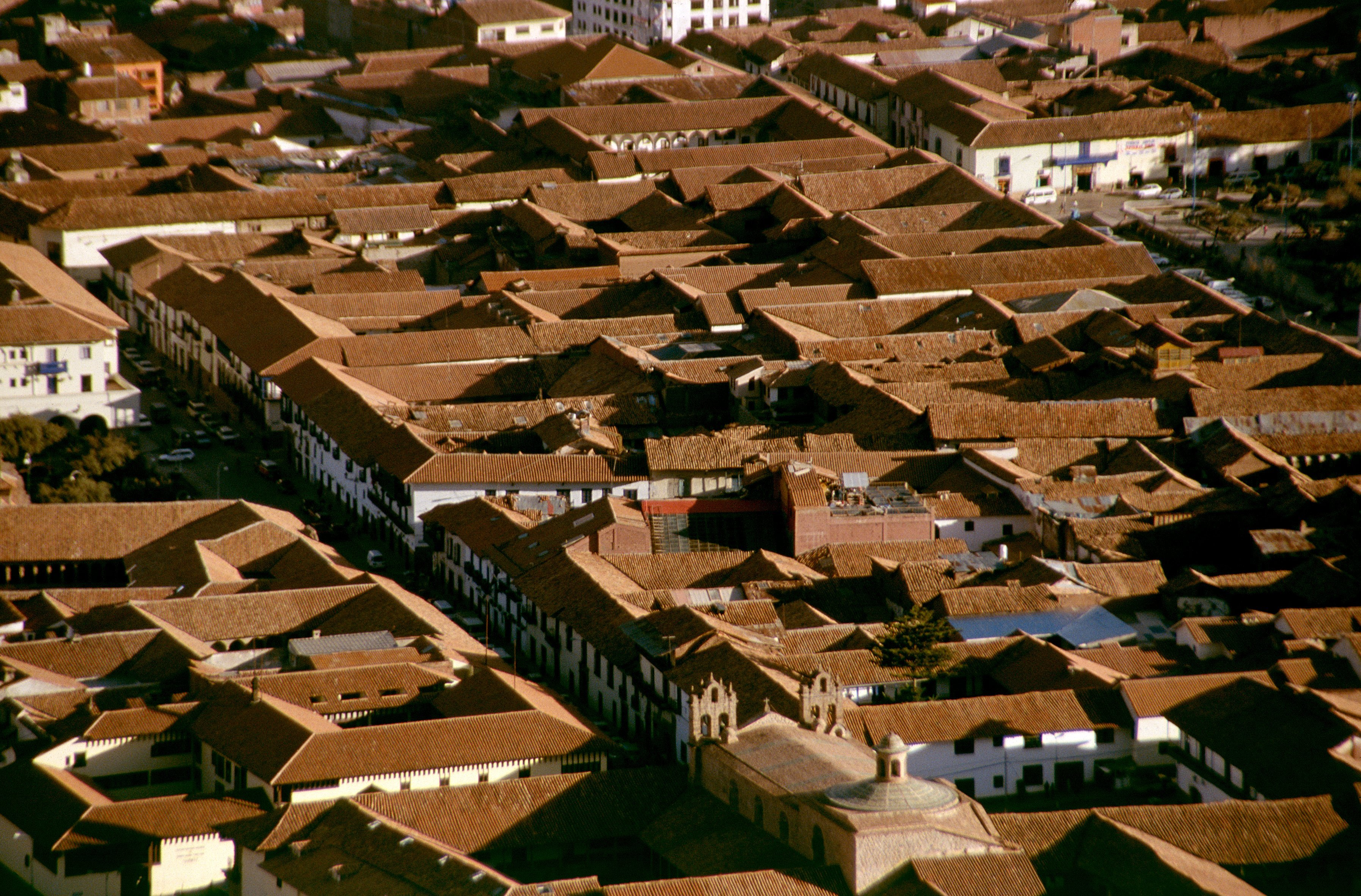
As per the Constitution of Peru, Cusco has been declared as the nation's Historical Capital.

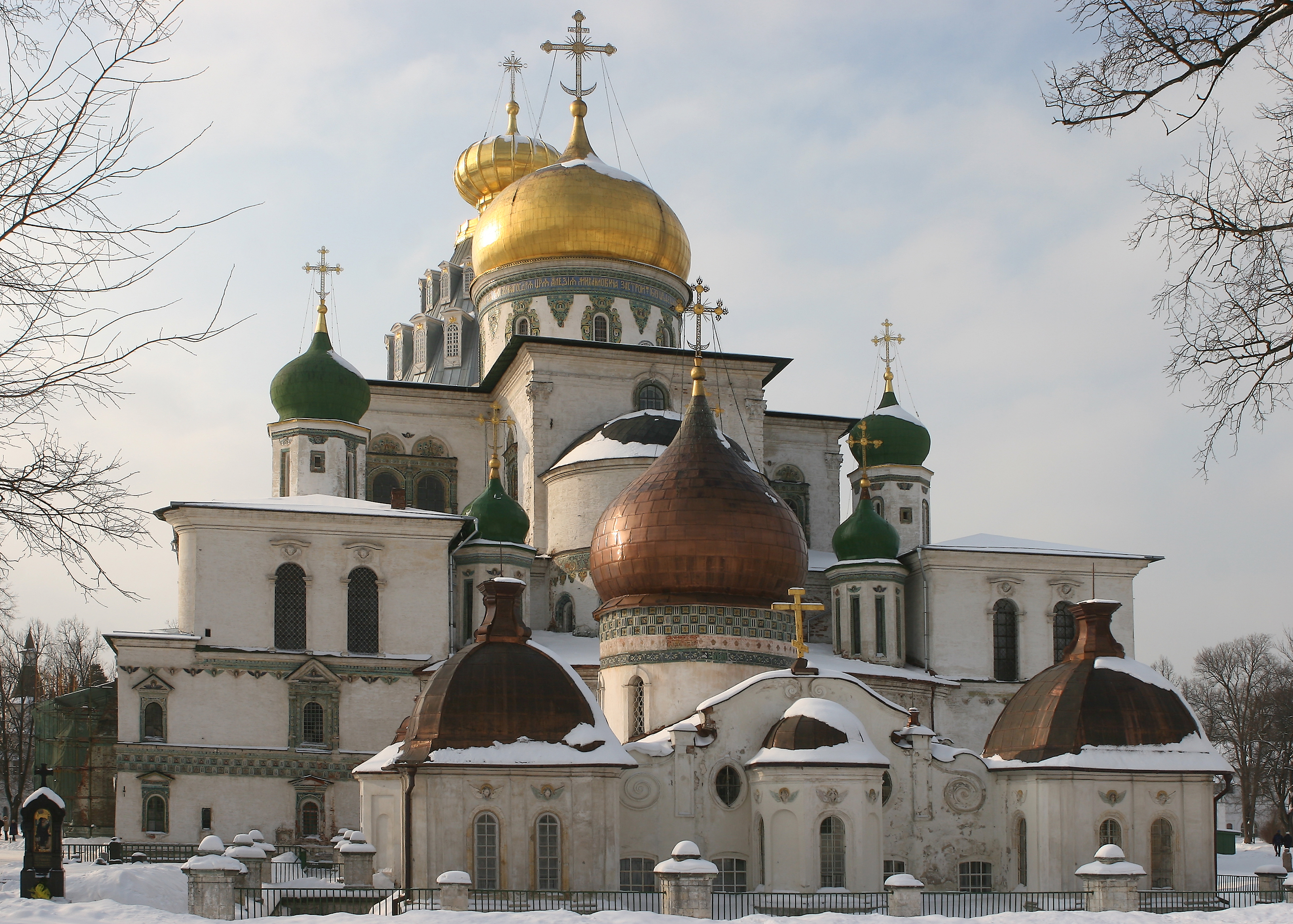
The Russian Resurrection New Jerusalem Monastery was severely bombed by German forces during World War II and has since been sporadically restored.

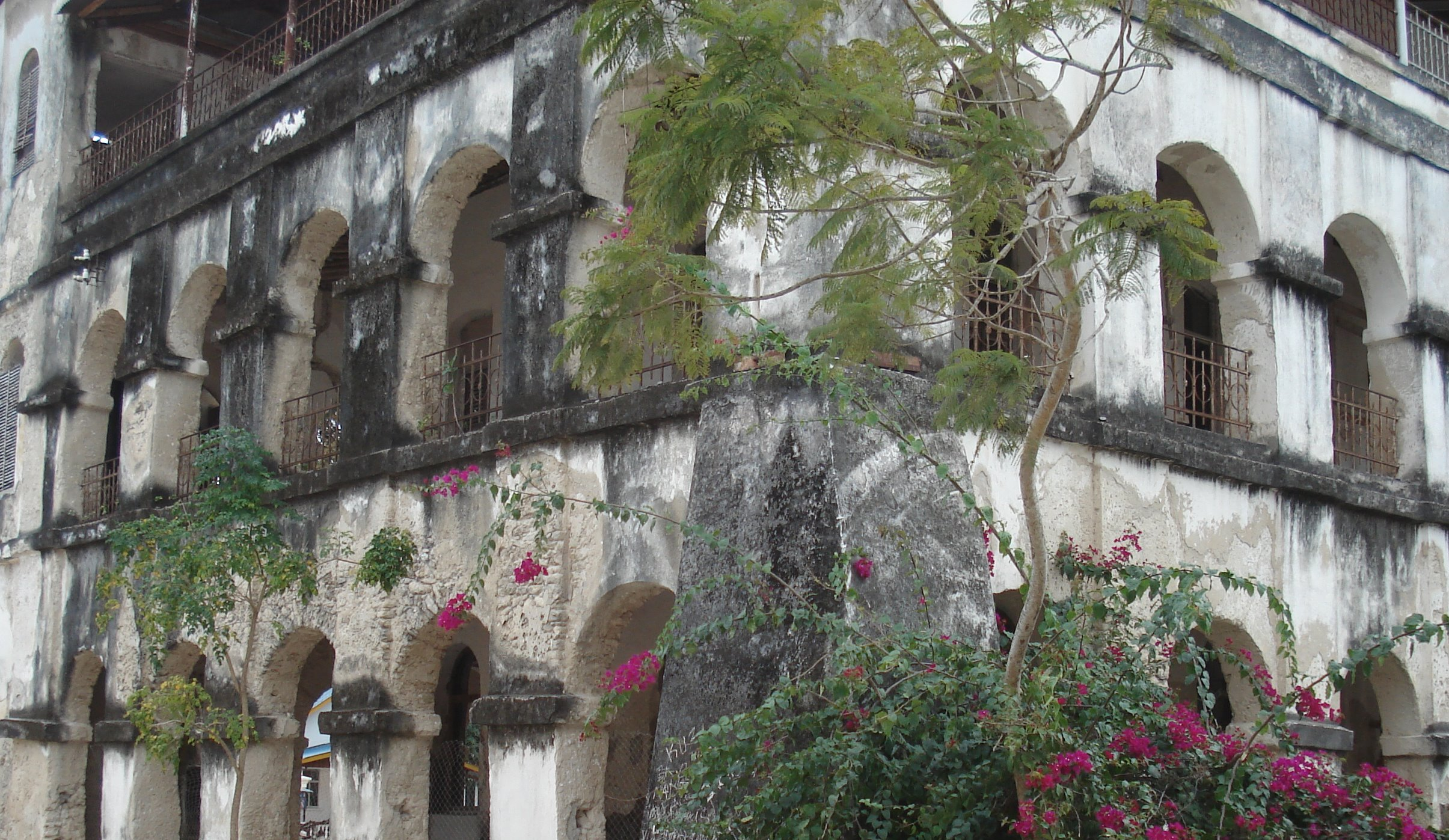
Tanzania's Bagamoyo, with its coral buildings specific to Swahili construction, was founded at the end of the 18th century as the capital of German East Africa. It served as a trading port for ivory and the slave trade.

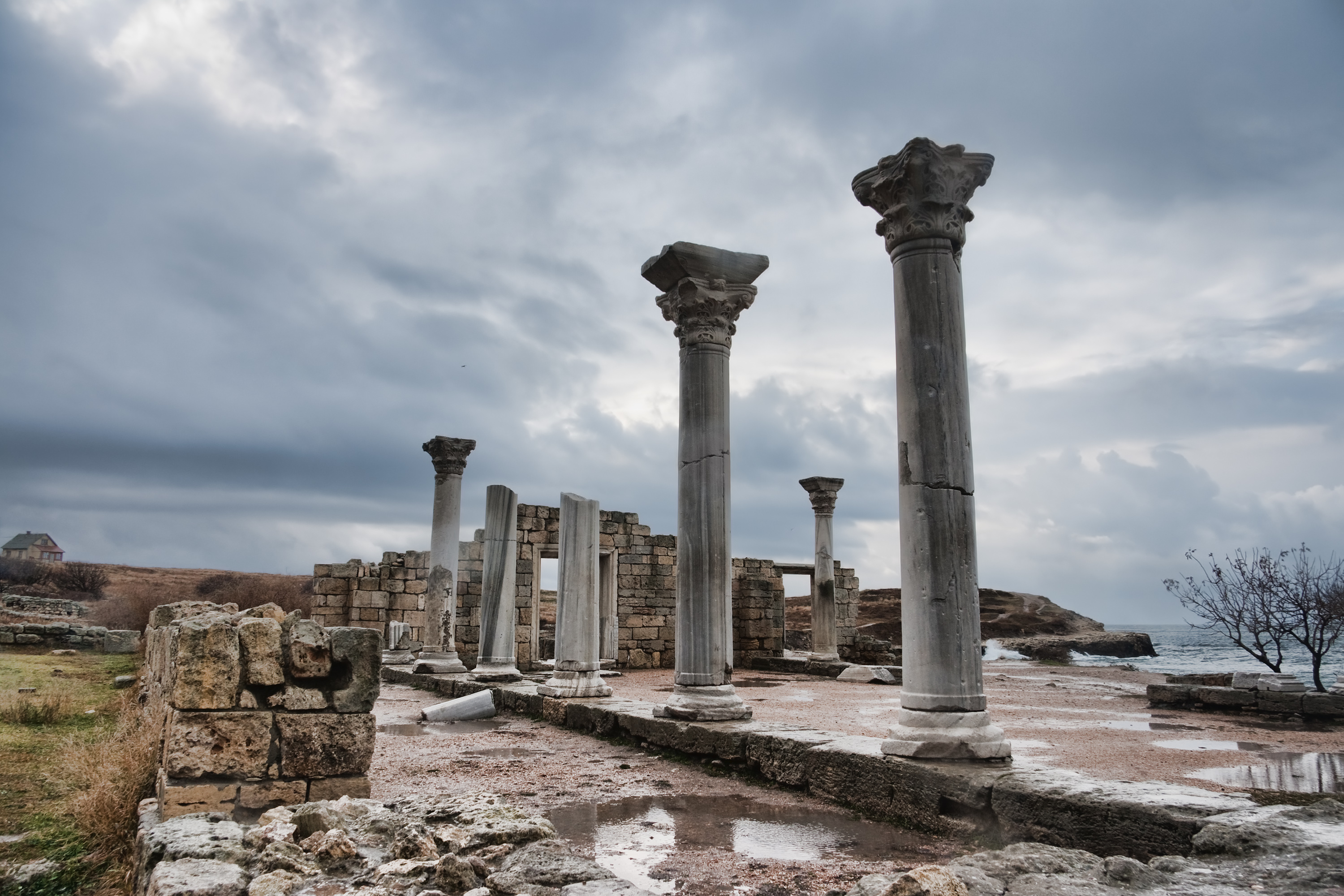
Preservation of the Ukrainian archaeological site of Chersonesos has been met with challenges, including a lack of funding, claims on property of by the Orthodox Church of the Moscow Patriarchate, urban sprawl and coastal erosion.

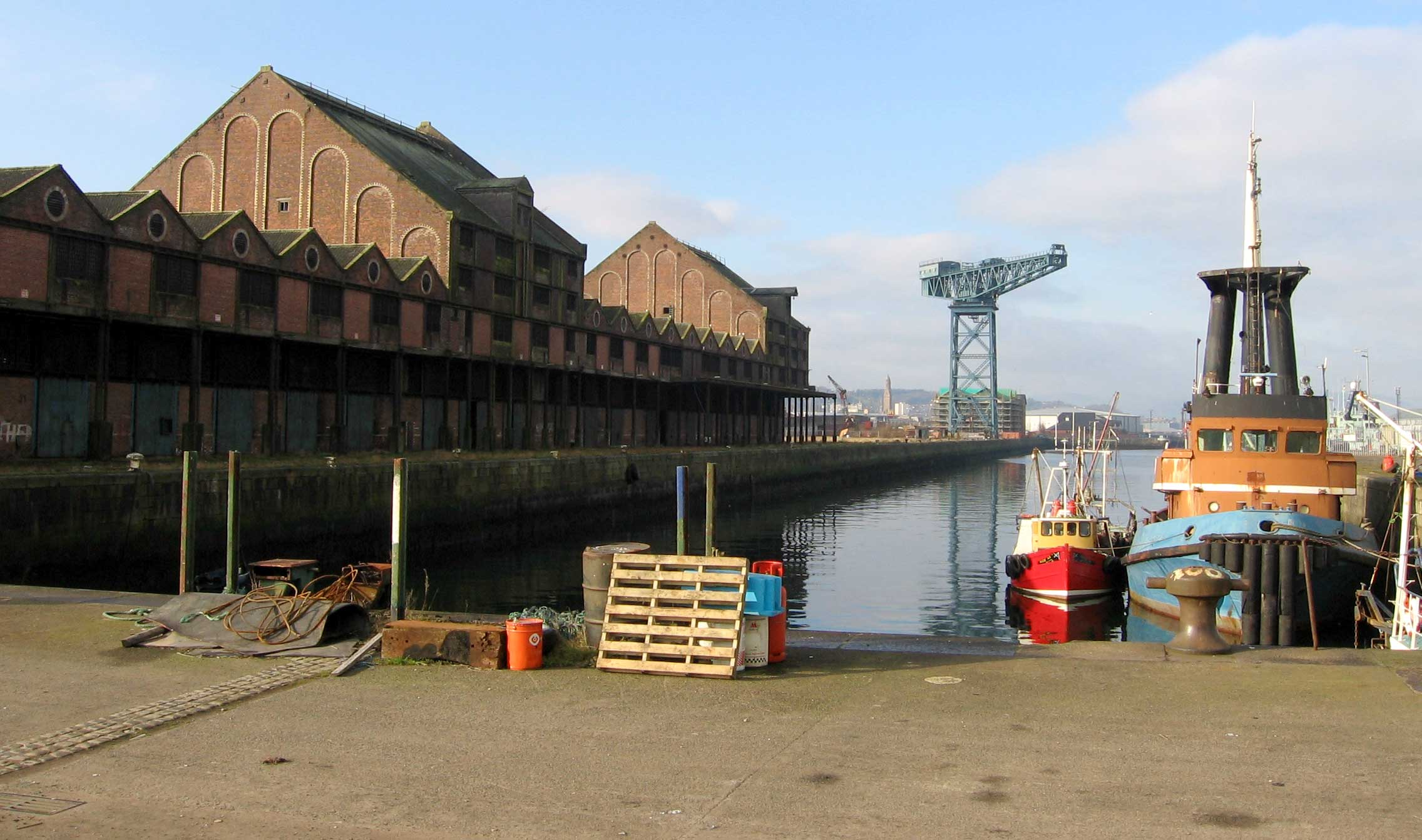
The Sugar Warehouse dominating Scotland's James Watt Dock is a rare, early example of structural cast iron externally expressed. It has lain empty since the last of the local's sugar refinery closed down in 1997.

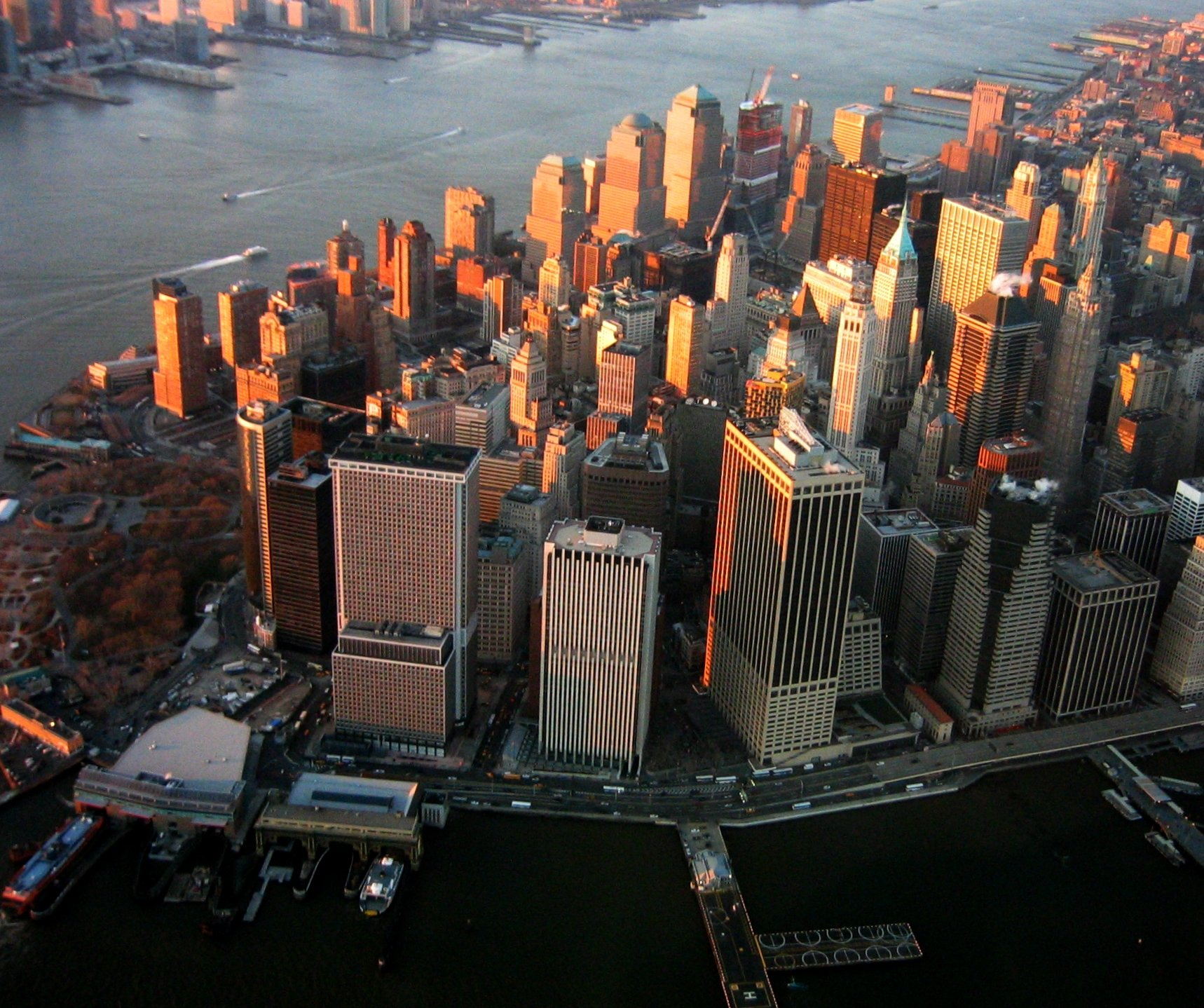
New York City's Lower Manhattan was placed on the 2002 Watch List as its 101st site following the September 11 attacks.

Number^{[A]}	Country/Territory	Site^{[B]}	Location^{[C]}	Period^{[C]}
1	Albania	Voskopoje churches	Korce	1780
2	Bahamas	Whylly Plantation at Clifton Point	Clifton Point, New Providence	1750
3	Belarus	Pervomaisk Church	Pervomaisk, Uzdensky, Minksaya	1626
4	Bosnia and Herzegovina	Mostar Historic Center	Mostar	1557
5	Brazil	Vila de Paranapiacaba	Santo Andre	1868
6	Cambodia	Banteay/Chhmar Temple of Jayavarman VII	Thmar Puok, Oddar Meanchey Province	1199
7	Chile	Ruedas de Agua	Pichidegua, Larmahue	1799
8	China	Shaxi Market Area	Shaxi Zhen, Shaxi Valley, Jianchuan	1800
9	China	Ohel Rachel Synagogue	Shanghai	1920
10	China	Da Qin Christian Pagoda and Monastery	Zhouzhi, Lou Guan Tai, Shaanxi	781
11	China	Great Wall of China Cultural Landscape (Beijing)	Beijing	14th-16th centuries
12	Croatia	Vukovar city center	Vukovar	1799
13	Croatia	Lazareti	Dubrovnik	1648
14	Cuba	National Art Schools	Cubanacan, Havana	1965
15	Czech Republic	Terezin Fortress	Terezin	1790
16	Egypt	Khasekhemwy at Hierakonpolis	Edfu, El Muissat, Kom el Ahmar	2700 BC
17	Egypt	Valley of the Kings	Thebes, West Bank at Luxor	1080 BC
18	Egypt	White and Red Monasteries	Sohag, Middle Egypt	500
19	Egypt	Sultan Al Muayyad Hospital	Cairo	1420
20	France	Chateau de Chantilly	Chantilly, Oise	1885
21	France	St. Pierre de Beauvais Cathedral	Beauvais, Oise	1700–1799
22	Georgia	Tbilisi Historic District	Tbilisi	500 BC–0 AD
23	Georgia	Bodbe Cathedral	Qedeli Village, Signakhi Region	850
24	Georgia	Art Nouveau Buildings	Tbilisi, Batumi, Kutaisi, Poti, Dusheti	1900
25	Germany	Carl-Theodor Bridge	Heidelberg	1788
26	Ghana	Larabanga Mosque	Larabanga, Western Gonja	1650
27	Greece	Palaikastro Archaeological site	Palaikastro, Crete	100
28	Guatemala	Piedras Negras	Piedras Negras	400 AD–800 AD
29	India	Basgo Gompa (Maitreya Temples)	Ladakh, Leh, Basgo	1699
30	India	Osmania Women College	Hyderabad, Telangana	1857
31	India	Dwarka Dheesh Mandir Temple	Ahmedabad	before 1600
32	India	Anagundi Historic Settlement	Gangawati, Koppal, Karnataka	1400–1600
33	India	Nako Temples	Himachal, Kinnaur, Nako	1025
34	India	Lutyens Bungalow Zone	New Delhi	1931
35	Indonesia	Omo Hada	Nias, Teluk Dalam, Hilinawalo Mazingo	1715
36	Iraq	Nineveh and Nimrud Palaces	near Mosul	883 BC – 681 BC
37	Iraq	Citadel of Arbil	Erbil, Kurdistan Region	6th millennium BC-Present
38	Israel	Bet She'arim Archaeological Site	Kiryat Tiv'on	100 – 300 AD
39	Italy	Chains Bridge	Bagni of Lucca	1860
40	Italy	Cinque Terre	Monterosso, Riomaggiore, Vernazza	13th century AD
41	Italy	Port of Trajan Archaeological Park	Fiumicino (Rome-Lazio Region)	100
42	Jamaica	Falmouth historic town	Falmouth, Parish of Trelawny	1784
43	Japan	Tomo Port Town	Fukuyama	1800
44	Jordan	Petra Archaeological Site	Wadi Mousa, Petra	100–299 AD
45	Kenya	Thimlich Ohinga Cultural Landscape	Migori	1399
46	Lebanon	Enfeh	near Tripoli	1299
47	Malaysia	Kampung Cina River Frontage	Kuala Terengganu	1939
48	Malaysia	George Town Historic Enclave	George Town, Penang State	1940
49	Mali	Medine Fort	Medine	1855
50	Malta	Mnajdra Prehistoric Temples	Mnajdra	3600 BC–2500 BC
51	Mexico	San Juan de Ulua Fort	Veracruz	1825
52	Mexico	Yaxchilan Archaeological Zone	Cuenca del Usumacinta, Chiapas	900
53	Mexico	Inmaculada Concepcion Chapel	Nurio, Michoacan	1700
54	Moldova	Barbary-Bosia Monastery Complex	Butuceni, Judet Orhei, Moldovan Auto. Reg.	1675
55	Myanmar	Sri-Ksetra Temples	Hmawa	400
56	Nepal	Teku Thapatali Monument Zone	Bagmati River, Kathmandu	19th Century
57	Nepal	Itum Monastery	Kathmandu	1200
58	Nigeria	Benin City Earthworks	Benin City, Edo State	1460
59	Pakistan	Uch Monument Complex	Uch, Bahawalpur District, Punjab Province	1449
60	Panama	San Lorenzo Castle & San Geronimo Fort	Chagres, Colon and Portobelo	1779
61	Peru	Historic Center of Cusco	Cusco	1699
62	Peru	Santuario de Nuestra Señora de Cocharcas	Cocharcas, Chincheros, Apurimac Dept.	
63	Peru	Caral sacred city	Supe Pueblo, Barranca Province, Caral	3000 BC–2000 BC
64	Peru	Los Pinchudos	Rio Abiseo National Park	1200
65	Peru	Oyon Valley Missionary Chapels	Oyon, Departamento de Lima	1699
66	Peru	San Pedro de Morrope Chapel	Morrope	1599
67	Poland	Wislica Archaeological Site	Wislica	1175
68	Russia	Alvar Aalto Library	Vyborg, Leningrad Region	1935
69	Russia	Arkhangelskoye State Museum	Moscow	1831
70	Russia	"Oranienbaum" State Museum Reserve	Lomonosov	1774
71	Russia	Narcomfin Building	Moscow	1930
72	Russia	Resurrection New Jerusalem Monastery	Istra	1698
73	Russia	Assumption Church	Kondopoga, Karelia	1774
74	Russia	Karelian Petroglyph Sites	Belomorsky and Pudozhsky Districts	3500 BC
75	Russia	Church of our Savior & Rostov Veliky Historic Center	Rostov Veliky	862–1690
76	Syria	The Citadel of Aleppo	Aleppo	2000 BC
77	Syria	Damascus Old City & Saddle Souk	Damascus	1400–1800
78	Tanzania	Bagamoyo Historic Town	Bagamoyo	1800
79	Turkey	Ani Archaeological Site	Ocarli Koyu, Kars	1399
80	Turkey	Temple of Augustus	Ankara	25 BC–20 BC
81	Turkey	Little Hagia Sophia Mosque (Kucuk Ayasofya Camii)	Istanbul	527–536
82	Turkey	Tepebasi District	Gaziantep	1914
83	Turkmenistan	Merv Archaeological Site	Bairam Ali	1400
84	Ukraine	Church of The Savior Of Berestove	Kyiv	1600–1800
85	Ukraine	Ancient Chersonesos	Sevastopol	500–15th century
86	United Kingdom	Stowe House	Stowe, Buckingham, Buckinghamshire	1890
87	United Kingdom	St. George's Church	London	1730
88	United Kingdom	Brading Roman Villa	Brading, Isle of Wight	300 AD
89	United Kingdom	Sinclair and Girnigoe Castles	Nr. Wick, Caithness, Scotland	1606
90	United Kingdom	Sugar warehouses	Greenock, Renfrewshire	1886
91	United Kingdom	Selby Abbey	Selby, North Yorkshire	1069
92	United States of America	San Juan Capistrano Mission Church	San Juan Capistrano	1806
93	United States of America	A. Conger Goodyear House	Old Westbury, Long Island, New York	1939
94	United States of America	St. Ann and the Holy Trinity Church	Brooklyn Heights, New York	1848
95	United States of America	San Esteban del Rey Mission at Acoma Pueblo	Acoma Pueblo, New Mexico	1643
96	United States of America	Schindler Kings Road House and Studio	West Hollywood, California	1922
97	Yemen	Tarim	Tarim, Wadi Hadramaut	1870–1920
98	Yugoslavia	Subotica Synagogue	Subotica	1902
99	Yugoslavia	Prizren Historic Center	Kosovo, Prizren	
100	Yugoslavia	Peć and Decani Monasteries	Kosovo & Metohiha, Decani and Pec	1850
101^{[D]}	United States of America	Historic Lower Manhattan	New York, New York	Since 1625

== Statistics by country/territory ==
The following countries/territories have multiple sites entered on the 2002 Watch List, listed by the number of sites:

Number of sites	Country/Territory
8	Russia
6	India, Peru, United Kingdom and United States of America^{[E]}
4	China, Egypt and Turkey
3	Georgia, Italy, Mexico and Yugoslavia
2	Croatia, France, Iraq, Malaysia, Nepal, Syria and Ukraine

== Notes ==
A. Numbers list meant only as a guide on this article. No official reference numbers have been designated for the sites on the Watch List.
B. Names and spellings used for the sites were based on the official 2002 Watch List as published.
C. The references to the sites' locations and periods of construction were based on the official 2002 Watch List as published.
D. WMF added the Historic Lower Manhattan area to the 2002 Watch List as its 101st site following the September 11 attacks.
E. Tally includes the Historic Lower Manhattan site.
