= Juanjui District =

Coordinates: 7.1802°S 76.7265°W

Juanjuí
- District
- Interactive map of Juanjuí
- Country: Peru
- Region: San Martín
- Province: Mariscal Cáceres
- Founded: February 7, 1866
- Capital: Juanjui

Government
  - Mayor: Walter Hildebrandt Saavedra

Area
  - Total: 335.19 km^{2} (129.42 sq mi)
- Elevation: 283 m (928 ft)

Population (2005 census)
  - Total: 26,126
  - Density: 77.944/km^{2} (201.87/sq mi)
- Time zone: UTC-5 (PET)
- UBIGEO: 220601

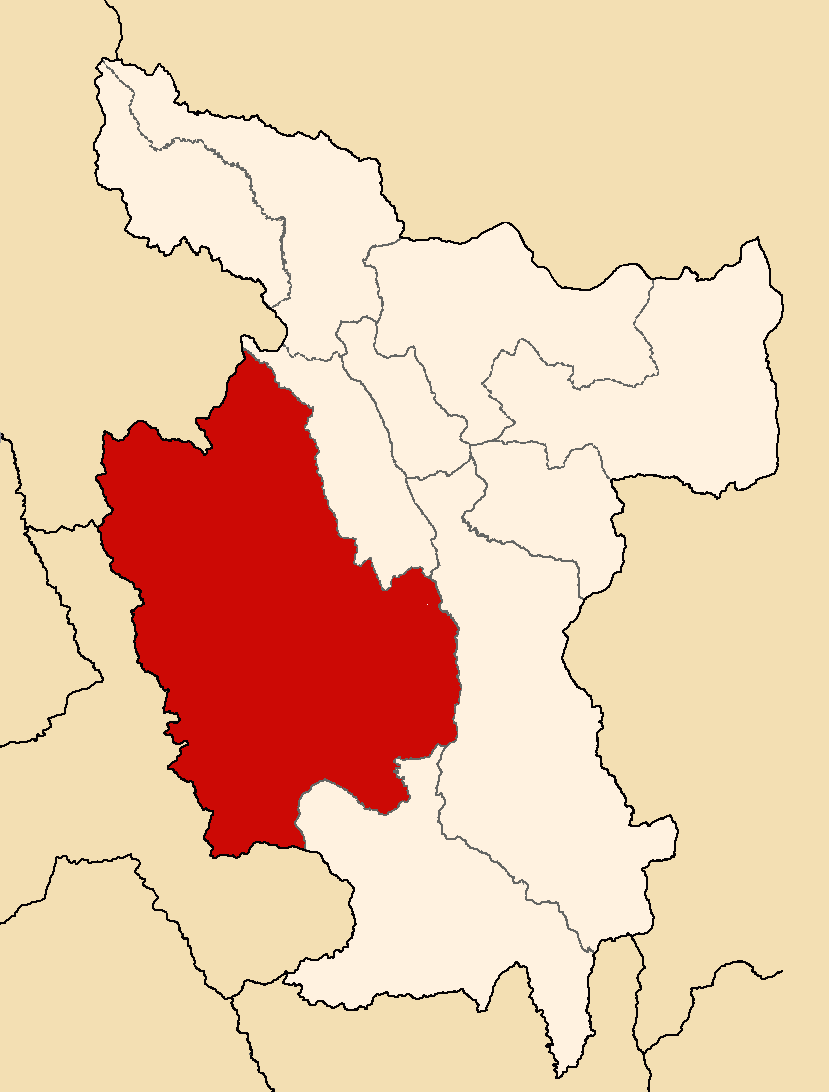
Mariscal Caceres in the San Martín region in Peru

Juanjuí District is one of five districts of the province Mariscal Cáceres in Peru.
