= International Community of Christ =

Christian denomination

International Community of Christ, Church of the Second Advent, is an independent Christian denomination that offers a distinctive, alternative presentation of Christian teachings and a new authoritative dispensation that it believes fulfills the messianic church under Jesus. The church functions primarily as a religious order known as the Order of the Holy Child (Jamilians). Originally organized in 1959 as the American Philosophical Institute of Cosolargy in New Smyrna Beach, Florida, it relocated to Peru, and in 1962 was renamed the Interdenominational Christian Church. The organization was subsequently known for a decade as the "Mystery School of the Andes" until a permanent center was established in Reno, Nevada, in 1972. Leading the International Community of Christ for more than three decades was Douglas Eugene "Gene" Savoy, who served as head bishop from 1971 until his death in 2007. He was succeeded in that office by his eldest son Gene Savoy Jr. who is now Head Bishop-Overseer of the International Community of Christ, Church of the Second Advent, and President of Cosolargy International.

== The Sun of Righteousness ==
The church maintains that Jesus was an Essene master teacher who, as earthly messiah and interpreter of God's law, came to announce the appearance of the Sun of Righteousness (Malachi 4:1–2) for the redemption of the human family. He came not only to restore the True Mosaic Law for Israel, but also to unify the religious Orders of Light who held to a common solar teaching known in different forms throughout the ancient world and who were expecting his coming. With Jesus's death and the martyrdom of his disciples, the new covenant of God was rejected and the redeeming force of the First Advent Sun of Righteousness was withdrawn from the world. However, it was prophesied by Jesus that in the End Times of the earth, God would again manifest as Christ through the Light of the Second Advent Sun of Righteousness (Matthew 24:27–31).

The church teaches that the long-awaited Second Coming is the appearance of the New Sun of Righteousness. which has been manifesting since 1962. This cosmic event, in which God has incarnated His presence in divine light, ushers in a dynamic and unprecedented age on earth, bringing forth universal Christ-consciousness into the world on a level never before experienced in human history. The advent of the Second Sun of Righteousness was announced by Jamil (1959–1962), a wondrous child seer whose birth had been predicted by the prophets of many traditions and whose life fulfilled the scriptural requirements of the one to come as God's final human messenger.

== The Process of Spiritual Regeneration and The System of Cosolargy ==
Fundamental to the Second Advent teaching is that people can participate in the manifesting cosmic Christ and commune with God by developing personalized Christ Consciousness through spiritual regeneration and self-transformation by means of a sacred process. This process, which was taught by Jesus and his immediate disciples and is the "secret" gospel, was lost to the established churches but has been repossessed by the Second Advent Church through revelation. It involves a highly advanced spiritual system of disciplines by which the individual spirit is brought into contact with God's Word through Light and made a living soul. The sacred system represents a living theology that the church calls Cosolargy (a word created from cosmic, solar, and logos).

A synthesis of scientific, metaphysical, and religious principles for modern men and women, Cosolargy is not restricted to the individual living the ascetic life. On the contrary, it is a cosmopolitan teaching that is available to anyone living in the modern world. Cosolargy teaches that solar light-energy is the carrier of intelligible information that, when properly applied by means of specialized solar techniques and other techniques of transcendence, activates latent psycho-physical and spiritual faculties (e.g., force centers and fields) in the individual, which leads to development of the spiritual Light body for ultradimensional participation in worlds of light while in the present time-space continuum. Cosolargy thereby provides the individual the means of achieving immortality of the spirit/soul and transcendence from lower-dimensional existence. The church teaches that such a system was at the core of ancient high religious traditions, including those of ancient America, now lost, in whole or part, to modern society. For church believers, an important doctrine is that Jesus taught a similar system of light as a means for the human being to be "reborn" in spirit and return to God.

The church holds that the world is in the End Times, a period prophesied by all the great religions, in which God's divine light will bring about a spiritual Golden Age that will restore a universal religion of light and eventually bring about the restoration of the creation to its original state. The church believes that a new solar epoch has dawned with the advent of the Sun of Righteousness. It teaches that man must learn to process the spiritual forces inherent within the heightened cosmic/solar energy streaming down upon the earth for the survival of the human species and for its continued evolution under a new state of the universe. Cosolargy restores and supplements the ancient spiritual systems of the past for the emergence of a highly developed, spiritually evolved modern individual. It is this tenet of the new advent, or appearance, of God's presence and the non-denominational character of Cosolargy that allows the Church of the Second Advent to claim its teaching to be truly ecumenical and universal, for it is not restricted to Christianity alone.

The arts, sciences, and technologies of Cosolargy constitute a new religious system made available to help the human species adapt to and survive new and increased levels of cosmic/solar radiation that are producing new life conditions on earth. In the broadest sense, Cosolargy represents the ideal ecological system because the perpetuation of the planet and the human species is dependent upon harmonious coexistence in accord with a changing environment. The marriage of science and religion becomes reality in Cosolargy because physiological, psychological, and spiritual attributes are involved directly with natural and supranatural laws. The Second Advent Church Community sees itself to be the precursor for the restoration of the great religions of the world, has been established to instruct humankind of this transforming condition, and is under mandate to revive and renew the Sacred Teachings of Light for those who seek illumination in the Second Advent Age. The Second Advent Church refers to this renewal as the "emerging new Christianity."

== Church Facilities and Services ==
In the Reno area, the church maintains chapels for communion, marriage, baptism, and other similar rites. At its 1,200-acre (4.9 km^{2}) desert sanctuary north of Reno, there are numerous open-air churches for the practice of its high liturgy. The church also runs a geothermal healing center at Steamboat Hot Springs south of Reno. The church's main office and administrative center for its teaching arm, the Jamilian University of the Ordained, has been located in downtown Reno since 1972 and its current location on Ralston Street since 1980. In addition to the church's teaching ministry, it provides pastoral services to its members and the general public and is active in the ecumenical and interfaith community through the Nevada Clergy Association and the Advocates for Religious Rights and Freedoms. Although the church has global membership, its world center is in Reno. A branch of the church and school was established in Japan in 2008. Associated with the church are the American Cosmic/Solar Research Center, the Order of the Holy Child, the Community Guilds, Advocates for Religious Rights and Freedoms, and the research program Project "X"—Search for the Secrets of Immortality.
