= Pachiza District =

Coordinates: 7.2943°S 76.7721°W

Pachiza
- District
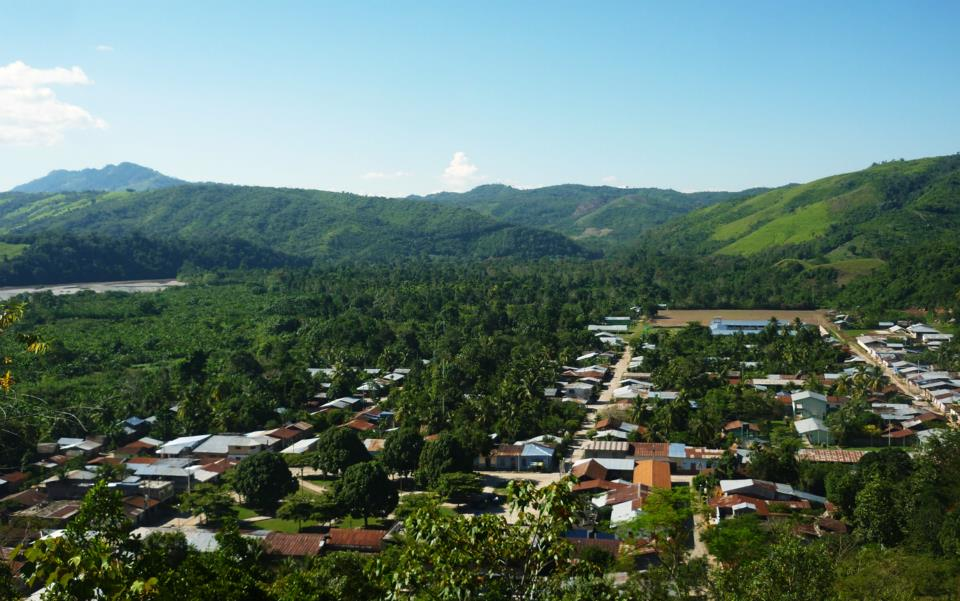
- Pachiza
- Interactive map of Pachiza
- Country: Peru
- Region: San Martín
- Province: Mariscal Cáceres
- Founded: February 7, 1886
- Capital: Pachiza

Government
  - Mayor: Ruben Segundo Ruiz Weninger

Area
  - Total: 1,839.51 km^{2} (710.24 sq mi)
- Elevation: 328 m (1,076 ft)

Population (2005 census)
  - Total: 4,122
  - Density: 2.241/km^{2} (5.804/sq mi)
- Time zone: UTC-5 (PET)
- UBIGEO: 220604

Pachiza District is one of five districts of the province of Mariscal Cáceres in Peru. Its seat is the small town of Pachiza.
