= Rio Abiseo National Park =

- IUCN category II (national park)
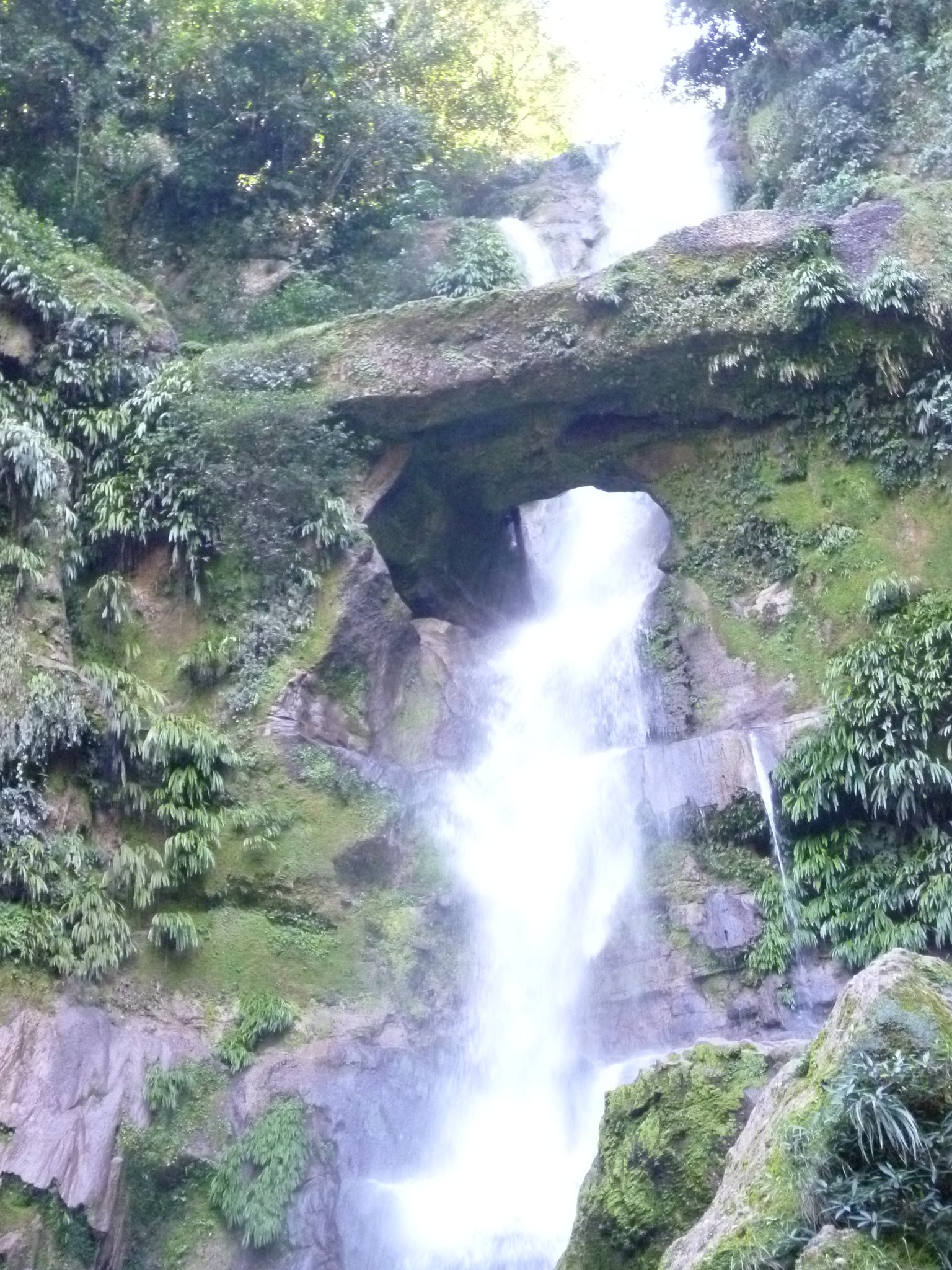
- El Breo waterfalls

- Location within Peru
- Location: Peru; Huicungo District, San Martín Region
- Coordinates: 7°45′S 77°15′W
- Area: 274,520 ha (1,059.9 sq mi)
- Established: August 11, 1983 (by 064-83-AG)
- Governing body: SERNANP

UNESCO World Heritage Site
- Official name: Río Abiseo National Park
- Location: Latin America and the Caribbean
- Criteria: Mixed: iii, vii, ix, x
- Reference: 548
- Inscription: 1990 (14th Session)
- Extensions: 1992
- Area: 272,407.95 ha (673,134.7 acres)

The Rio Abiseo National Park (Spanish: Parque Nacional del Río Abiseo) is located in the San Martín department of Peru. UNESCO pronounced it as Natural and Cultural Heritage of Humanity (World Heritage Site) in 1990. The park is home to many species of flora and fauna, as well as the location of over 30 pre-Columbian archaeological sites. Since 1986, the park has not been open to tourism due to the fragile nature of both the natural and archaeological environment.

== Geography and climate ==
Located in the San Martín Region of Peru between the Marañón and Huallaga rivers, the park has an area of approximately 2,745.2 square kilometres. The park covers 70% of the Abiseo river basin. Elevations reach as high as 4,200 meters (13,780 ft) above sea level and as low as 350 m (1,150 ft).

The park protects three distinct ecoregions: Ucayali moist forests at lower elevations, Peruvian Yungas at middle elevations, and Cordillera Central páramo at the highest elevations.

There are at least seven climate zones in the park, including montane forest, tropical alpine forest, montane rainforest, high Andean grasslands (puna), and dry forest. Rainfall ranges from 20 to 80 inches (2.0 m) per annum. The montane cloud forest, composing most of the park area, is a high-altitude rainforest with short trees, moss and lichen. This ecosystem occurs above the altitude of about 2,300 meters (7,550 ft). High humidity is constant and rain falls throughout the year, particularly at the higher elevations. The soil is acidic.

== Wildlife ==
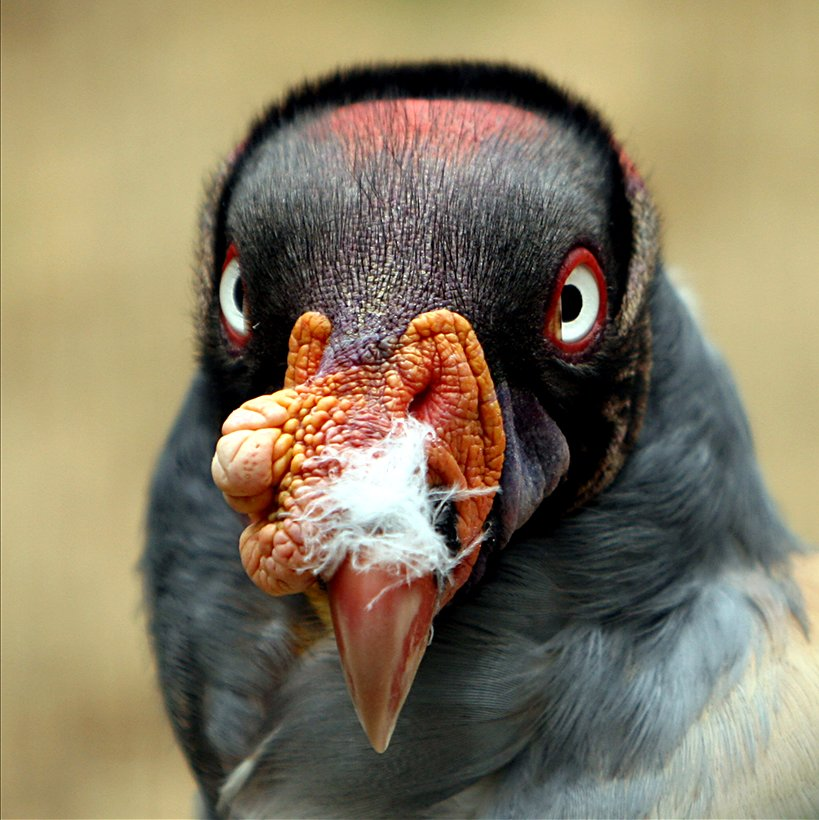
King vulture, Sarcoramphus papa

The yellow-tailed woolly monkey, Oreonax flavicauda, previously thought to be extinct, is known to live in the park and appears to be endemic to the region. It was mostly due to this monkey's critically endangered status that the area gained national park status and was placed on the list of World Heritage Sites in 1983.

Other fauna in the park includes:

- Andean guan, Penelope montagnii
- Venezuelan red howler, Alouatta seniculus
- White-fronted spider monkey, Ateles belzebuth (endangered)
- Jaguar, Panthera onca
- King vulture, Sarcoramphus papa
- Three-striped night monkey, Aotus trivirgatus
- Curassaw, Crax salvini
- Peruvian guemal, Hippocamelus antisensis (endangered)
- Mountain paca or punatuacher, Agouti tazcanowskii (endangered)
- Southern pochard duck, Netta erythrophthalma
- Spectacled bear, Tremarctos ornatus (endangered)
- Turkey vulture, Cathartes aura
- White-fronted capuchin, Cebus albifrons cuscinus
- Hairy long-nosed armadillo Dasypus pilosus
- Yellow-crowned amazon, Amazona ochrocephala
- Russet-mantled softtail, Phacellodomus berlepschi (endangered)
- Yellow-browed toucanet (endangered)

There are 980 known species of plants documented in the highlands of the park, 13 of which are endemic, and 5000 species of plants in the area of the Rio Abiseo.

== Archaeology ==
The most famous archaeological site in the Rio Abiseo park is Gran Pajatén, a ruined settlement atop a forested ridge overlooking the Montecristo River canyon. Nearby are the ruins of Los Pinchudos a series of cliff tombs discovered by Pataz villagers in the early 1970s. Gran Pajatén, Los Pinchudos and other archaeological remains identified in the park are usually attributed to the Chachapoyas culture. The most extensive archaeological work done in Rio Abiseo Park was led by the University of Colorado during the mid-1980s.

== See also ==
- Iperu, tourist information and assistance
- Tourism in Peru
