= Campanilla District =

Coordinates: 7.4844°S 76.6544°W

Campanilla
- District
- Interactive map of Campanilla
- Country: Peru
- Region: San Martín
- Province: Mariscal Cáceres
- Founded: January 24, 1959
- Capital: Campanilla

Government
  - Mayor: José Humberto Puelles Olivera

Area
  - Total: 2,249.83 km^{2} (868.66 sq mi)
- Elevation: 310 m (1,020 ft)

Population (2005 census)
  - Total: 7,526
  - Density: 3.345/km^{2} (8.664/sq mi)
- Time zone: UTC-5 (PET)
- UBIGEO: 220602

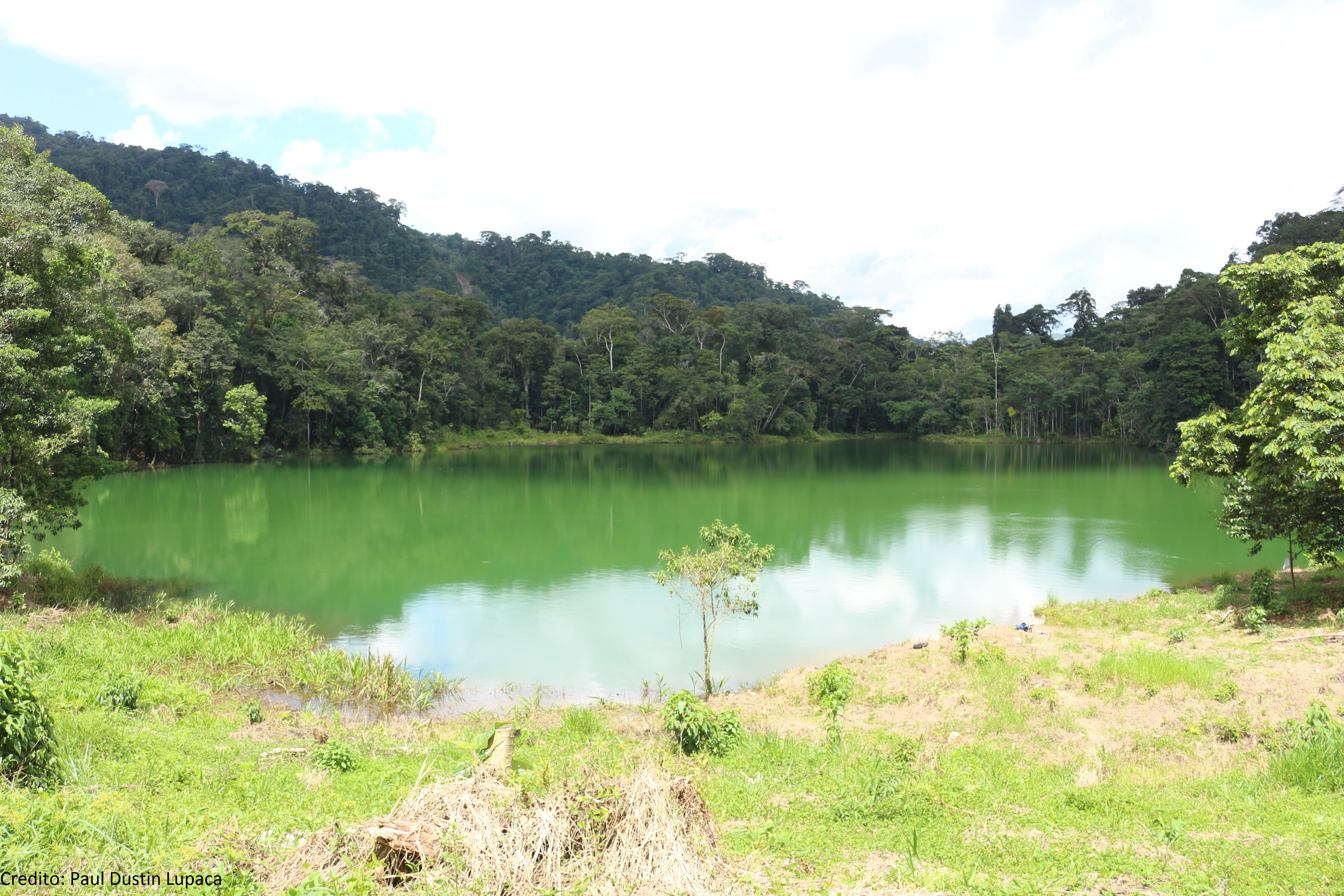
Picture of the Lake in the district

Campanilla District is one of five districts of the province Mariscal Cáceres in Peru. The area is home to members of the Kichwa-Lamista ethnicity, who migrated to the region from Sisa between 1920-1970.

== Climate ==
Climate data for Campanilla, elevation 316 m (1,037 ft), (1991–2020)
Month	Jan	Feb	Mar	Apr	May	Jun	Jul	Aug	Sep	Oct	Nov	Dec	Year
Mean daily maximum °C (°F)	33.0 (91.4)	32.4 (90.3)	32.1 (89.8)	32.0 (89.6)	32.0 (89.6)	31.6 (88.9)	31.7 (89.1)	33.0 (91.4)	33.5 (92.3)	33.5 (92.3)	33.1 (91.6)	33.0 (91.4)	32.6 (90.6)
Mean daily minimum °C (°F)	22.6 (72.7)	22.5 (72.5)	22.4 (72.3)	22.4 (72.3)	22.1 (71.8)	21.5 (70.7)	20.8 (69.4)	20.7 (69.3)	21.1 (70.0)	22.1 (71.8)	22.6 (72.7)	22.6 (72.7)	22.0 (71.5)
Average precipitation mm (inches)	145.9 (5.74)	203.5 (8.01)	225.9 (8.89)	208.1 (8.19)	148.6 (5.85)	100.2 (3.94)	71.5 (2.81)	73.9 (2.91)	105.9 (4.17)	201.0 (7.91)	197.5 (7.78)	164.1 (6.46)	1,846.1 (72.66)
Source: National Meteorology and Hydrology Service of Peru
