= Juanjuí =

- Town
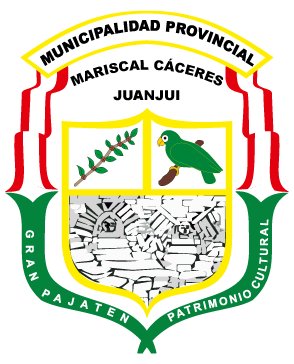
- Seal
- Nicknames: Ciudad de los Encantos (The city of the Charm), Cuna historica del Gran Pajatén (Historical birthplace of Gran Pajatén)
- Location within Peru
- Coordinates: 7°10′48.86″S 76°43′35.28″W
- Country: Peru
- Region: San Martín
- Province: Mariscal Cáceres
- District: Juanjuí

Government
  - Mayor: Victor Raúl López Escudero leader_title1 =
- Elevation: 283 m (928 ft)

Population
  - Total: 54,006
- Time zone: UTC-5 (PET)
- Website: www.munijuanjui.gob.pe
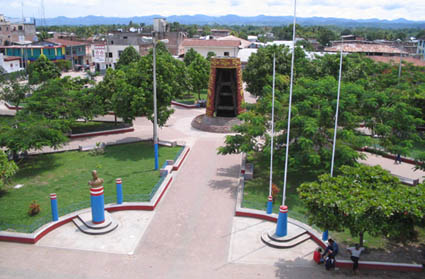
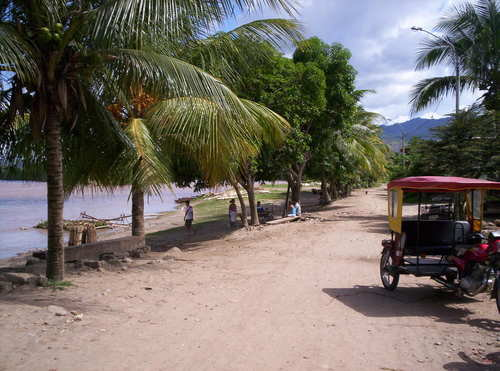
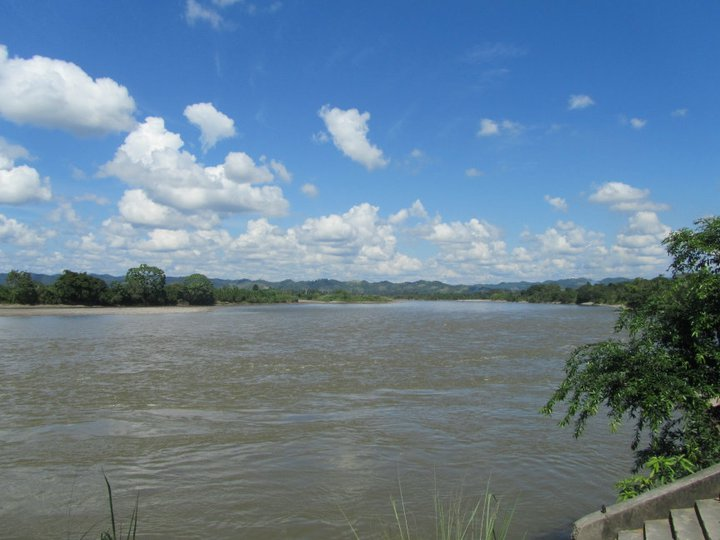
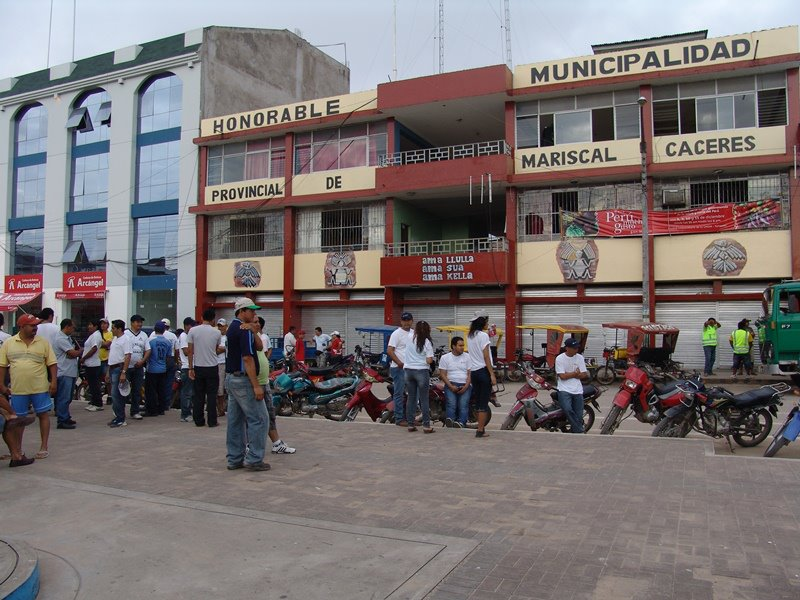
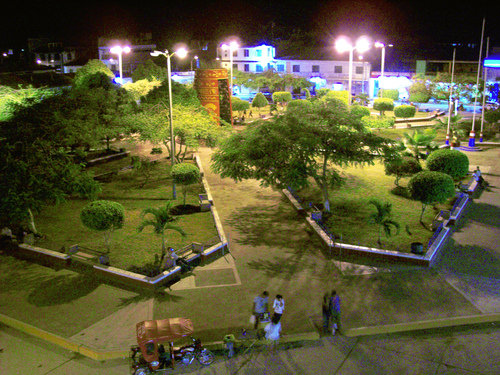
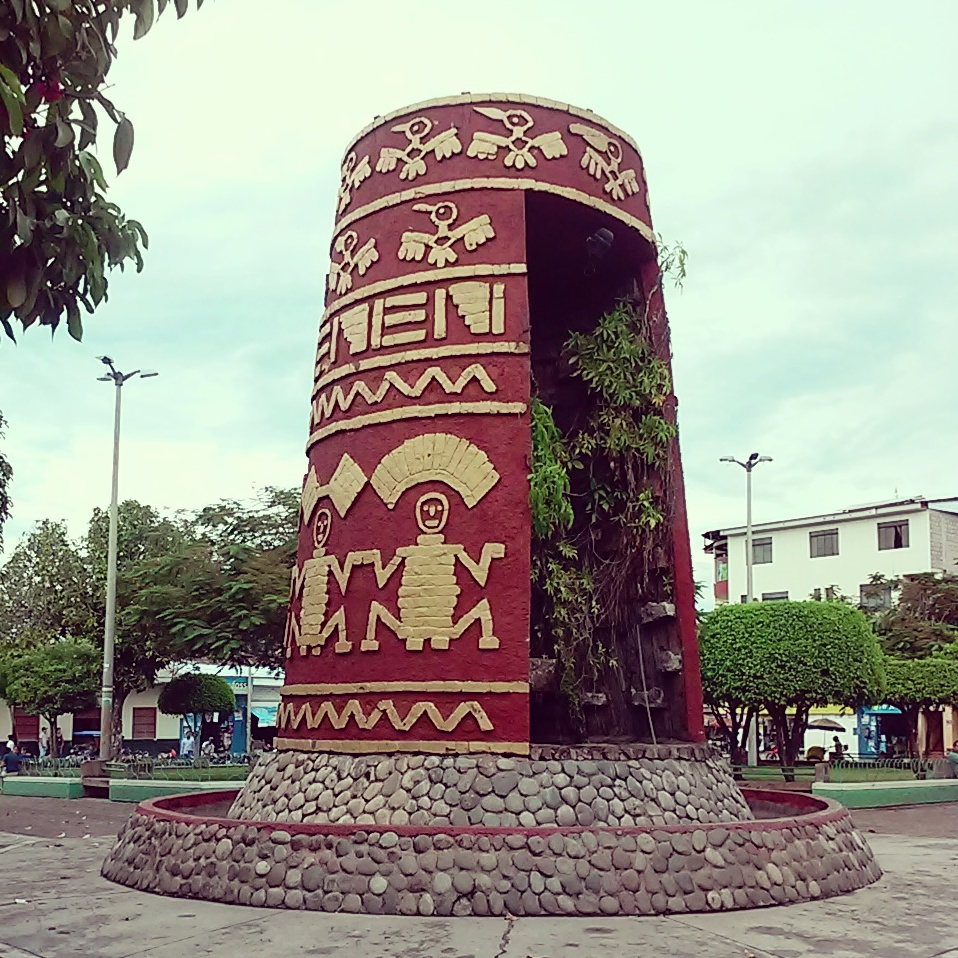

Juanjuí is a town in Northern Peru, capital of the province Mariscal Cáceres in the San Martín Region and located in the left edge of Huallaga River. There are 54,006 inhabitants, according to the 2010 census.

== History ==
The Spanish captain José Gaspar López Salcedo founded this city on September 24, 1827 under the name of Juanjui a contraction of "Juan Huido" (Juan, the escaped). The population of Juanjui was originally formed mainly by Kichwa-Lamista immigrants from the province of Lamas, who migrated from the late eighteenth and early decades of the nineteenth century.

It is said that the pioneer of these immigrants was an Amerindian named Juan, who fled the Lamas, or by the mistreatment or persecution for justice of the missionaries. He came to give these territories and to live with the people of Chacho Village. After some years he returned to Lamas and brought his family and some other families who came attracted by the abundance of references wildlife. This immigration was intensified even further the independence cause. By then the settlement of Chacho Lamas was already known as the land of "Juan Huido", with it came more immigrants from Lamas.

Over the years, Juan Huido was derived the name of Juanjui to designate in any way to these territories.

On July 2, 1940. Juanjui was declared capital city of the new province of Mariscal Caceres.

== Geography ==
=== Climate ===
Juanjui has a tropical climate, warm and humid.

Climate data for Juanjuí
Month	Jan	Feb	Mar	Apr	May	Jun	Jul	Aug	Sep	Oct	Nov	Dec	Year
Daily mean °C (°F)	27 (81)	26 (79)	26 (79)	26 (79)	26 (79)	25 (77)	25 (77)	26 (79)	26 (79)	27 (81)	27 (81)	27 (81)	26 (79)
Average precipitation mm (inches)	101 (4.0)	144 (5.7)	164 (6.5)	180 (7.1)	119 (4.7)	74 (2.9)	64 (2.5)	65 (2.6)	87 (3.4)	162 (6.4)	152 (6.0)	118 (4.6)	1,429 (56.3)
Source: Weatherbase

== Neighborhoods ==
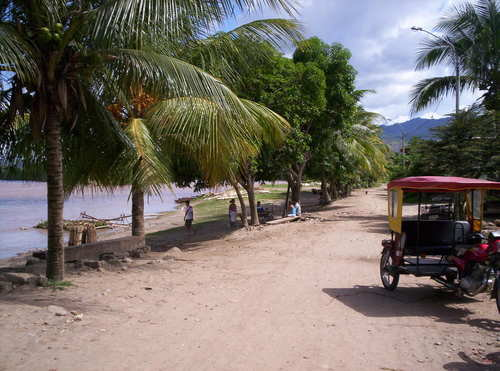
Palm Trees in Puerto Amberes.

In Juanjui, there are 8 representative neighborhoods around downtown:

- Chambira
- Juanjuicillo
- La Merced
- La Victoria
- Puerto Amberes
- San Juan
- Santa Rosa

== Gran Pajaten monuments ==
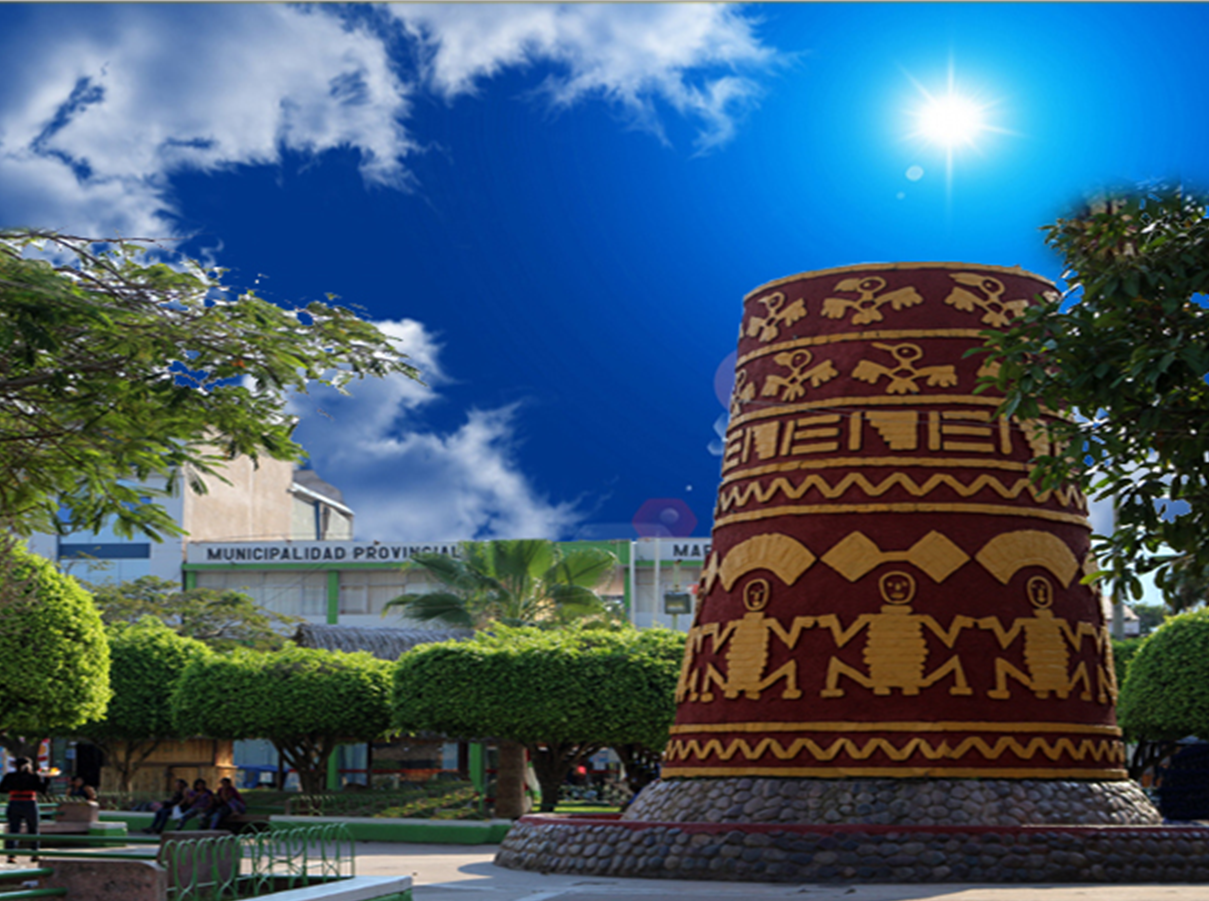
Gran Pajaten inspired tower in the town's 'Plaza de armas'

The town has some monuments dedicated to the ancient Gran Pajaten settlement that is located close by. This is related to Chachapoya culture.

== Twin towns - Sister cities ==
- Chiclayo, Peru
- Chiba Prefecture, Japan
- Tingo Maria, Peru
- Utrecht, Netherlands
- Hafnarfjörður, Iceland
- Cordoba, Argentina

== See also ==
- Kuelap
