= Los Pinchudos =

Archaeological site in Peru

Los Pinchudos is an elaborate Chachapoya tomb complex, perched in a high rock cleft in one of Peru's northern Andean cloud forests. Los Pinchudos is located in Río Abiseo National Park, a natural and cultural World Heritage Site, guarded and closed to all except scientific missions. The clay and stone tombs of the complex have wooden roofs and are painted in red, yellow, black, and white colors. Anthropomorphic carvings featuring prominent phalluses are responsible for giving the site its name. Los Pinchudos is located very near the related site of Gran Pajaten.

== Preservation ==
Due to the tombs' deteriorated condition, a result of seismic activity, exposure to the tropical environment, and damage by tourists, Los Pinchudos was listed in the 2000 World Monuments Watch by the World Monuments Fund. In 2000 American Express offered $47,000 through the Fund for an emergency conservation and structural stabilization project. While these emergency actions were successful, the site was also listed on the 2002 World Monuments Watch in order to raise awareness for additional conservation work required at the site and for the need of a permanent site management plan.

"Los Pinchudos" are large statues which feature male anatomy. These inspired the name, "Los Pinchudos", which is slang for "the ones with big penises."-Gwin Peter. The researchers believe that these tombs and their surroundings can teach us many things about the vanished culture. The site is located in the Rio Abiseo National Park which is a natural and cultural World Heritage, which has been closed to the public and where tourism is not permitted at all. Government officials are studying to see if they can figure out how this area can be accessed, which has to be done with caution because this is a site where there is always research going on. Not only are tourist not allowed but the scientists have some areas that are restricted to them as well in order to protect the cloud forest, the archaeological sites, and keep the extreme rare yellow-tailed woolly monkey from going extinct. Los Pinchudos is a precious cultural and natural place. It is the ancient burial of ground of the Chachapoyas. The fact that these monuments are exposed to extreme weather due to the tropical environment has brought the structures there to the verge of collapse. Still to this day they wonder how the wooden statues of Los Pinchudos have yet not rotted away.
