= Gene Savoy =

American explorer and theologian (1927–2007)

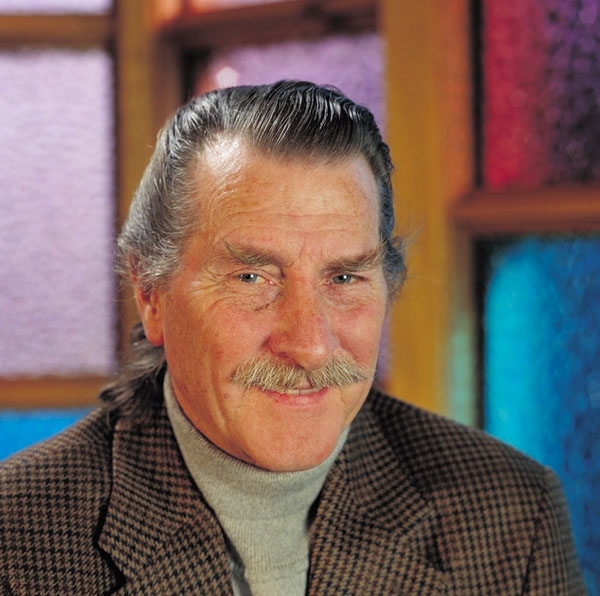
- Gene Savoy, c. 2000
- Born: Douglas Eugene Savoy; May 11, 1927; Bellingham, Washington, U.S.
- Died: September 11, 2007 (aged 80); Reno, Nevada, U.S.
- Occupations: Explorer; author; religious leader; theologian

Douglas Eugene "Gene" Savoy (May 11, 1927 – September 11, 2007) was an American explorer, author, religious leader, and theologian. He served as Head Bishop of the International Community of Christ, Church of the Second Advent from 1971 until his death. Rising to prominence as one of the premier explorers of Peru in the 1960s, he is best known for his claims to have discovered more than 40 lost cities in Peru and is credited with bringing to light a number of Peru’s most important archeological sites, including Vilcabamba, the last refuge of the Incas during the Spanish conquest, and Gran Pajaten, which he named but did not discover.

== Early life ==
Savoy was born in Bellingham, Washington. At age 17 he enlisted in the U.S. Navy and served two years during World War II, after which he enrolled at the University of Portland to begin studies for the priesthood. Following an incident when one of his professors told him that the ideas he expressed in one of his papers were "very close to heresy," Savoy went to see the dean of men and legendary counselor, Monsignor John B. Delaunay, who told Savoy that he reminded him of Teilhard de Chardin and, recognizing that Savoy had some mission to perform, encouraged Savoy to take off a year to "follow his heart" and pursue his studies privately rather than remain in school.

Initially shocked by this advice, Savoy went on to work as a journalist for the next ten years while he continued his studies of regional Indian petroglyphs and of religion. During those years, he spent much of his time studying the literature, legends, and folklore of the North American Indians in the Pacific Northwest, intrigued by the possibility that there may have been early contacts between North and South America. He also studied mystic Judaism and Christianity, Buddhism, Hinduism, Zoroastrianism, the Chinese classics, and the Gnostic writings during that time under direct disciples of Khalil Gibran and Paul Brunton.

In 1956, Savoy’s life changed utterly. His business collapsed and took with it his home, his belongings, and his marriage. As luck would have it, however, his documentary film of Columbia Gorge petroglyphs and carvings was picked up by a national news service, and his theories about similarities between North and South American picture drawings attracted the attention of an American archeologist who offered to take Savoy on an expedition to Peru as a photographer. Eager to fulfill his dream of becoming an explorer, Savoy accepted. In 1957, Savoy moved to Peru and a few years later began to organize his own archaeological expeditions under the auspices of the Andean Explorers Club, which he founded and which later grew into the Andean Explorers Foundation & Ocean Sailing Club.

== Explorer ==
Throughout the 1960s, Savoy carried out a series of well publicized expeditions in Peru, exploring and documenting various pre-Columbian archaeological sites. In 1964, he identified a ruin called Espiritu Pampa as the legendary Vilcabamba, the 16th century capital of the Neo-Inca Empire and the last refuge of the Incas during the Spanish conquest. This discovery disproved Hiram Bingham’s belief that Machu Picchu and Vilcabamba were one and the same. In 1965, Savoy explored and brought worldwide attention to a site he named Gran Pajatén, an ornately ornamented stone city located in northeastern Peru. His discovery of this site, as well as Vilcabamba and other sites, is disputed. From 1965 to 1970, he continued his explorations into Peru’s eastern montañas.

In 1969, Savoy built and captained the Kuviqu (also known as the "Feathered Serpent I"), a totora-reed raft of ancient design, along 2,000 miles of ocean coastline from Peru to Mesoamerica in an effort to prove that Peruvians and Mexicans could have maintained contact in ancient times and that the legendary heroes Viracocha and Quetzalcoatl were one and the same. Soon afterwards, he captained the "Feathered Serpent II", which he sailed from the United States to the Caribbean, to Central and South America, and finally to Hawaii, to study ocean and wind currents. In 1997, he sailed a 73-foot wooden catamaran from Peru to Hawaii in a dramatic effort to demonstrate that ancient Peruvians could have sailed the open seas.

Savoy returned to the United States in the early 1970s, but continued his explorations throughout the latter half of the 20th century.

In 1984, after a 13-year absence, Savoy began journeying back into Peru. The next year he discovered Gran Vilaya and in 1999 Gran Saposoa in Chachapoyas territory. Both were grand city complexes of thousands of stone structures that solidified his theory that the eastern Peruvian jungles — in addition to the Andes and the coast — had been the location of high civilization. He died in Reno, Nevada, aged 80.

Savoy’s uneasy relationship with the academic archaeologist community, who deplored his swashbuckling ways while they built on his discoveries for their own research, is exemplified by the comment of archeologist Keith Muscutt, who pointed out that finding ruins "is about as hard as finding elephants in a zoo" on the mountain ridges of northern Peru where Savoy made most of his discoveries, a region University of Florida archeologist Michael Moseley compared to "the Amazon jungle stretched over the Rocky Mountains." Scientists have also questioned Savoy’s tendency to use his explorations to pursue uncommon theories, e.g. his claim that King Solomon acquired gold and precious stones from Peru (Ophir). "Savoy's involvement in the Chachapoya saga clouds the scientific issues, attracts a lot of crackpots and scares off serious researchers who don't want to constantly have to deal with Savoy's tedious legacy of lost cities/El Dorado fantasies and other delusions," said archaeologist Keith Muscutt.

The central driving idea behind all Savoy’s exploring was to show that the jungle was not on the fringes of Peruvian culture but at its center. It was this concept that led him on his obsessive search for the legendary cities of the Chachapoyas. Savoy emphasized that he continually returned to historical sources in order to find clues for his searches:

No sensible man goes down into the jungle unless he's got something to follow. I see explorers as people with open minds who can scan many different sources for information, unconfined by an academic discipline, just like computers scan the internet. We've all learnt that the great thing is to follow the roads. Roads lead to ruins.

The advice to 'follow the roads', meaning the Inca roads, was taken to heart by the Andean explorer Vince Lee who had some fruitful discussions with Savoy before embarking on his own Andean explorations.

Savoy's major discoveries gained him recognition as the "real Indiana Jones" by People magazine after his parallel career as religious leader and researcher became known.

== Spiritual researcher and religious educator ==
Over several decades, Savoy uncovered and institutionalized a modern system for spiritual self-regeneration rooted in the hidden teachings of the Essenes who, he was convinced, were the forebears of Jesus. He called the spiritual discipline Cosolargy, believing that similar esoteric systems were practiced by ancient high holy orders around the world, including those of ancient America, and were eventually lost, in whole or in part, to modern society.

In 1959, he established the Cosolargy Institute (also known as the American Philosophical Institute of Cosolargy) to follow new conditions in the sun and to undertake further research into the spiritual teachings of ancient solar cultures. He later formalized this research under the auspices of the American Cosmic Solar Research Center, established in 1962, and the research program Project "X": The Search for the Secrets of Immortality, established in 1970, all of which continue to function through the Jamilian University.

In 1959, Savoy also established the International Community of Christ, Church of the Second Advent to impart Cosolargy as the basis for a new understanding of the authentic Christian teaching and of the Essenes and Jesus as precursors to a modern messianic age. He taught that Christ had come again as prophesied, not as a human messiah, but as a celestial mediating force available to all humankind through the manifesting Spiritual Sun spoken of in Malachi 4:1-3 and in the Essene Book of Hymns, to usher in a new epoch. The church teaches that Jesus prophesied the future coming of Christ as the "Sun of Righteousness" and that the cosmic phenomenon of the Messianic Sun began in 1962, as revealed by Savoy’s son, Jamil (1959–1962), a wondrous child seer who lived in the Andes of Peru. The notion that Savoy believed his son Jamil to be the Second Coming of Christ is a misunderstanding that arose during his first interview with a local newspaper as head bishop of the church and has been repeated in newspapers ever since as a boiler plate item, appearing even in one of his obituaries. Bishop Savoy addressed this misconception directly in a 1985 theological lecture:

People may say that the sun is an ordinary sun. Is it? It is to the person that sees it as an ordinary sun. People may say: "Jamil had no purpose. He was just an ordinary child. Why did God have to use The Child? Who needs him?" I have been accused of building a monument to my dead son, and people laugh at me because I speak about Jamil in the way that I do. The Child was an Image, and that Image was a vehicle for the manifestation of God’s Word. Therefore, The Child was necessary. But The Child is not a Jesus Christ. He certainly is not a "savior" in the strictest sense of the word. He is merely a conveyor of information from one world to the other for our use, much the same as was Jesus. We are not saved by any human, neither Jamil nor Jesus. We are saved by God. Therefore, God teaches us by the creation and the manifestation of the Image as a vehicle and intermediary by which the Word manifests and speaks to us. Therefore, Jamil was not ordinary nor is the sun ordinary. There is a New Sun and there is a new humankind coming into existence. Jamil was the first of that New Race.

Through the years, Savoy produced a steady stream of scholarly and transcendent literature, which included more than 60 volumes on Cosolargy, the Essenes, the origins of Christianity, and comparative religion; and he delivered over 400 lectures on metaphysics, philosophy and theology, which form the core lectures of the Sacred College program of the Jamilian University of the Ordained. Collectively, these texts and lectures present what Savoy saw as the real teachings of Christ and communicate how the recovery of this information can assist in bringing religious enlightenment to today’s world.

== Books ==
Exploration

- Antisuyo: The Search for the Lost Cities of the Amazon (Simon and Schuster, 1970)
- On the Trail of the Feathered Serpent (Bobbs-Merrill, 1974)
- Project X: The Search for the Secrets of Immortality (Bobbs-Merrill, 1977)
- The Gran Vilaya Report (Andean Explorers Foundation & Ocean Sailing Club, 1996)

Religion

Publications of the International Community of Christ:

- Cosolargy Papers, 12 volumes (1970–1975)
- Jamil: Child of Light (1973, 2009)
- Prophecies of Jamil, 7 volumes (1973–1982)
- The Decoded New Testament (1974, 1983)
- Academy Symposia, 12 volumes (1975–1980)
- The Image and The Word, 6 volumes (1976–1981)
- Project "X" Symposia, 8 volumes (1978–1981)
- The Essaei Document: Secrets of an Eternal Race (1978, 1983)
- Lost Gospel of Jesus: The Hidden Teachings of Christ (1978, 1984)
- The Book of God’s Revelation (1983)
- Miracle of the Second Advent: The Emerging New Christianity (1984)
