= Pajarillo District =

Coordinates: 7.1791°S 76.6989°W

Pajarillo
- District
- Interactive map of Pajarillo
- Country: Peru
- Region: San Martín
- Province: Mariscal Cáceres
- Founded: December 15, 1961
- Capital: Pajarillo

Government
  - Mayor: José Gilberto Idrogo Vera

Area
  - Total: 244.03 km^{2} (94.22 sq mi)
- Elevation: 310 m (1,020 ft)

Population (2005 census)
  - Total: 5,072
  - Density: 20.78/km^{2} (53.83/sq mi)
- Time zone: UTC-5 (PET)
- UBIGEO: 220605

Pajarillo District is one of five districts of the province Mariscal Cáceres in Peru.
