= Edna Jackson Carver =

American physician and spa owner (1868–1954)

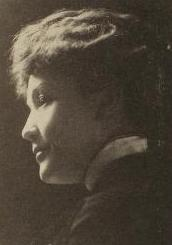
- Edna Jackson Carver, from a 1915 publication.
- Born: Edna Jackson; 1868; Salina, Kansas, U.S.
- Died: June 20, 1954 (aged 85–86); Steamboat, Nevada, U.S.
- Education: Colorado College of Osteopathy
- Occupation: Physician
- Known for: Owner of Steamboat Hot Springs Spa
- Spouse: Edward Towne
- Children: 1 son, Dural Edward Towne
- Parent(s): William Edward Jackson, Amanda Davis
- Relatives: Minnie Jackson Martin, Charles Francis Jackson

Edna Jackson Carver (1868 – June 20, 1954) was an American physician, operator of a health spa at Steamboat Hot Springs, near Reno, Nevada, from 1919 to 1954.

== Early life ==
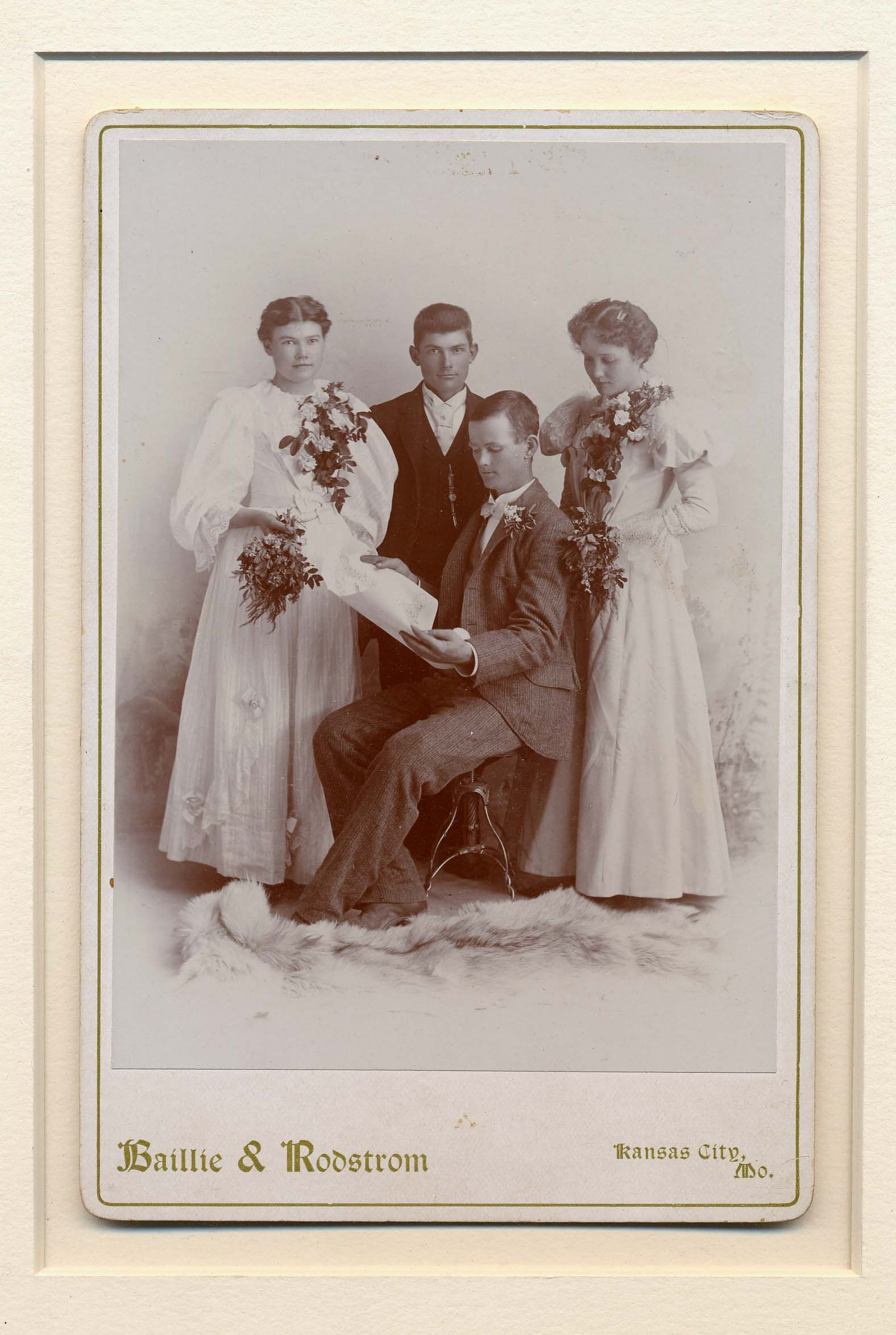
Left to Right: Sula Sackett, Carl Sackett, J.M. White (Seated) and Edna Jackson. First Graduating Class of the Wyoming Collegiate Institute of Big Horn, Wyoming.

Edna Jackson was born in Salina, Kansas and raised in Sheridan, Wyoming Territory, the daughter of William Edward Jackson and Amanda Davis Jackson. She was a member of the first graduating class of the Wyoming Collegiate Institute that once stood in Big Horn, Wyoming.

She graduated from the Colorado College of Osteopathy in 1905. She was a charter member of the Sheridan chapter of the Order of the Eastern Star.

== Career ==
Carver had an osteopathic practice in Denver, and invested in land there. She also practiced in New York City for six years. In 1913, she spoke at the International Congress of Farm Women in Tulsa, on the subject "Keeping the Right Mental Attitude", telling her audience, "It is a great thing to earn a living, but it is a greater thing to live a life." She was the physician and head chaperone on a film company's publicity train trip in 1915, called the "American Beauty Special"; it ran from Chicago to Los Angeles, filled with beauty contest winners hoping for a screen test in Hollywood.

Carver became the owner of Steamboat Hot Springs in 1918. She rebuilt the lodgings and bathing facilities, and opened it as a health spa in 1919. She drilled deep wells to access additional springs, and welcomed athletes and racehorses for rehabilitation. In the 1940s, after several fires damaged buildings on the campus of the facility, she worked with architect Paul Revere Williams on a plan for the expansion and modernization of the resort, but that vision was never realized.

Away from Steamboat Springs, Carver was a frequent speaker and leader at the Unity Center church in Reno. She also took an active interest in education, and served as president of the Reno school board in the 1930s. In 1933 she attended a national social science convention in Detroit. In 1934 she spoke about polio at a parent-teacher meeting in Sparks. In 1936, she helped to treat injured fellow passengers when their train encountered an avalanche.

== Personal life ==
Edna Jackson married English-born Edward Towne; they had a son, Dural Edward Towne (1899-1960). She lived for many years with Blanch Foltz, who died in 1953. Edna Carver died in 1954, in Steamboat Springs, and left the springs property to her son. Her daughter-in-law Dorothy A. Towne, a nurse, ran the spa from 1962 until 1986, when she donated it to a local church. The Steamboat Hot Springs are still open, as "the longest standing therapeutic hot springs in the state of Nevada."
