= Gran Pajatén =

Archaeological site in Peru

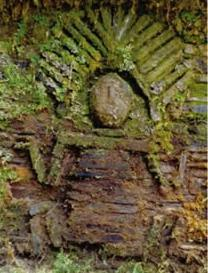
- Relief from the walls at Gran Pajatén.

- Location within Peru
- Interactive map of Gran Pajatén
- 7.649°S 77.418°W
- Cultures: Chachapoyas culture
- Location: Peru; San Martin Region
- Part of: Rio Abiseo National Park

History
- Built: 200 BCE

Site notes
- Area: 20,000 m^{2} (220,000 sq ft)
- Owner: Peruvian government

Gran Pajatén is an archaeological site located in the Andean cloud forests of Peru, on the border of the La Libertad region and the San Martín region, between the Marañon and Huallaga rivers. The archaeological site lies in the Rio Abiseo National Park, which was established in 1983. The park was designated a UNESCO World Heritage Natural Site in 1990, and Cultural Site in 1992. In order to protect the fragile ruins and endangered environment, the archaeological site and the national park are currently not open to visitors without permits from Peru's Ministry of Agriculture and National Institute of Culture.

The related site of Los Pinchudos is located very near Gran Pajaten.

== Description ==
Gran Pajatén sits on a hilltop above the Montecristo River valley, and consists of a series of at least 26 circular stone structures atop numerous terraces and stairways. The ruins occupy an area of about 20,000 m^{2}. The principal buildings are decorated with slate mosaics displaying human, bird and geometric motifs. Analysis of ceramic samples and radiocarbon dates show that the area was occupied as early as 200 BCE, but the visible building ruins on the present site were constructed during Inca times. Based primarily on architectural evidence, the settlement is attributed to the Chachapoyas culture.

=== Discovery ===
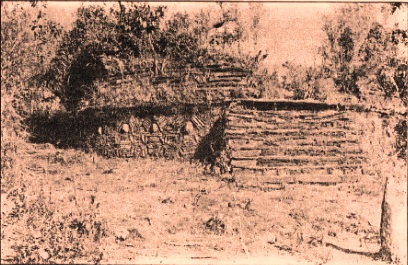
View of the main structure at Gran Pajatén.

Explorer Gene Savoy is erroneously credited with having found the ruins in 1965. The site is rumored to have been discovered around 1929 by Juanjui resident Eduardo Pena Meza while exploring the area for a possible road project. However, there is no evidence that ruins he encountered were those of Gran Pajatén or ruins of another abandoned prehispanic settlement. Therefore, the "discovery" of Gran Pajatén is sometimes attributed to villagers from the town of Pataz in 1963. After he was guided to the site by Pataz villagers in 1965, Savoy claimed credit by publicizing the discovery in the world press as his own. An official Peruvian government expedition visited the site and began to clear vegetation in late 1965. By 1966, the Peruvian government had set up a helicopter pad and cleared much of the protective vegetation that surrounded the site. Many years later, these actions raised criticism due to the delicate nature of the archaeological site. Without the protection of dense vegetation, the stone ruins began to rapidly deteriorate.

=== Preservation ===
In 1985, a team led by the anthropology department at University of Colorado began a major research project at Gran Pajatén and surrounding archaeological sites in the park. The expedition was widely publicized, and this second large-scale investigation led to further discussions of opening the site up to tourism. A Peruvian televised expedition in 1990 once again cleared the protective vegetation from the site, and further damaged the ruins. Currently, there are plans for construction of several roads and tourist infrastructure in the region. Neither have been implemented due to the fragile nature of the ruins and the high cost of conserving the site while minimizing tourist impacts on its archaeological integrity and environmental context.

At present (2023), the World Monument Fund is financing conservation work at Gran Pajatén as well as renewed archaeological investigations.

== See also ==
- Kuélap
- Peruvian Sol
