= Huicungo District =

Coordinates: 7.3202°S 76.7872°W

Huicungo
- District
- Interactive map of Huicungo
- Country: Peru
- Region: San Martín
- Province: Mariscal Cáceres
- Founded: May 7, 1940
- Capital: Huicungo

Government
  - Mayor: Rodil Cachique Cappillo

Area
  - Total: 9,830.17 km^{2} (3,795.45 sq mi)
- Elevation: 335 m (1,099 ft)

Population (2005 census)
  - Total: 5,682
  - Density: 0.5780/km^{2} (1.497/sq mi)
- Time zone: UTC-5 (PET)
- UBIGEO: 220603

Huicungo District is one of five districts of the province Mariscal Cáceres in Peru.
