= Mariscal Cáceres province =

Coordinates: 7°10′36″S 76°43′44″W

Mariscal Cáceres
- Province
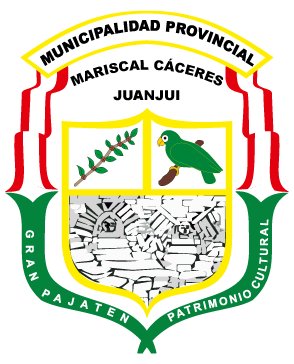
- Coat of arms

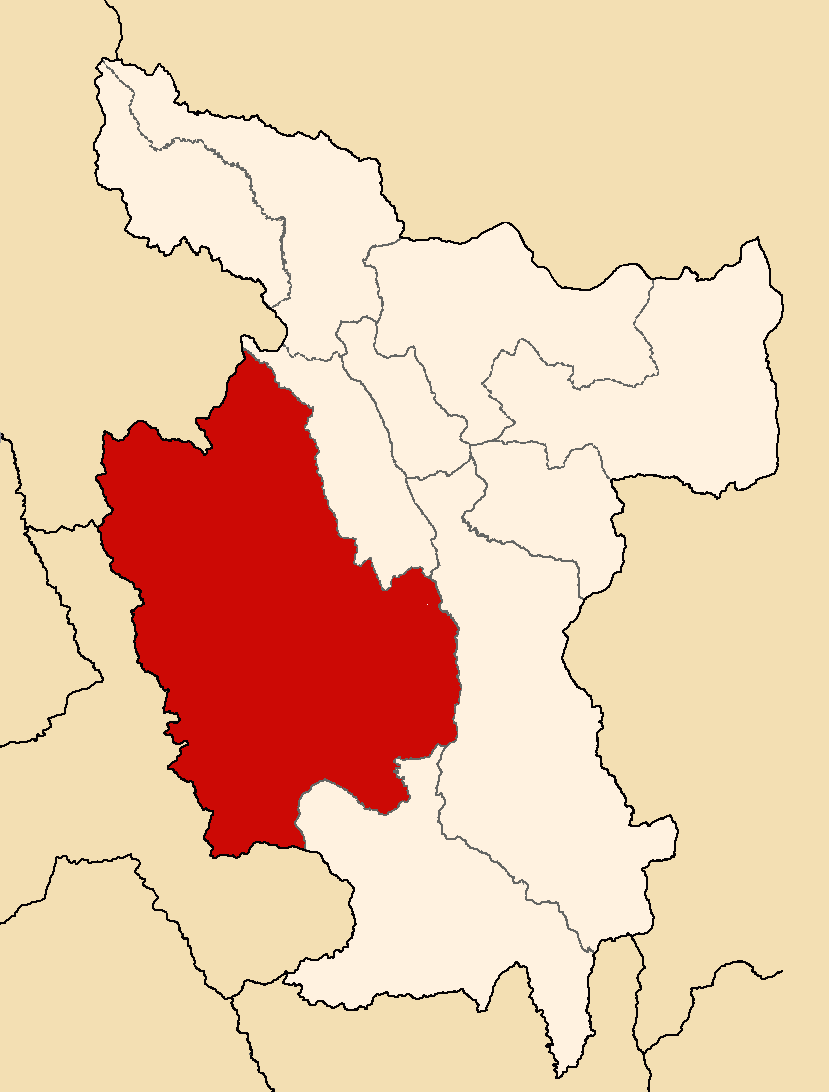
- Location of Mariscal Cáceres in the San Martín Region
- Country: Peru
- Region: San Martín
- Capital: Juanjuí

Area
  - Total: 14,498.73 km^{2} (5,597.99 sq mi)

Population (2002 estimate)
  - Total: 72,327
  - Density: 4.9885/km^{2} (12.920/sq mi)
- UBIGEO: 2206

Mariscal Cáceres (Spanish: provincia de Mariscal Cáceres) is one of the provinces of San Martín Region, Peru. Its capital is the town of Juanjui. It was created by a law of the Peruvian congress during the presidency of Manuel Prado Ugarteche.

The province is named after the 19th-century Peruvian president Andrés Avelino Cáceres.

== Political division ==
Mariscal Cáceres Province is divided into five districts:

- Campanilla District, centered in the settlement Campanilla
- Huicungo District, centered in the settlement Huicungo
- Juanjui District, centered in the town Juanjui
- Pachiza District, centered in the settlement Pachiza
- Pajarillo District, centered in the settlement Pajarillo
