= Eastern Panamanian montane forests =

Ecoregion in Panama and Colombia

Eastern Panamanian montane forests (NT0122)
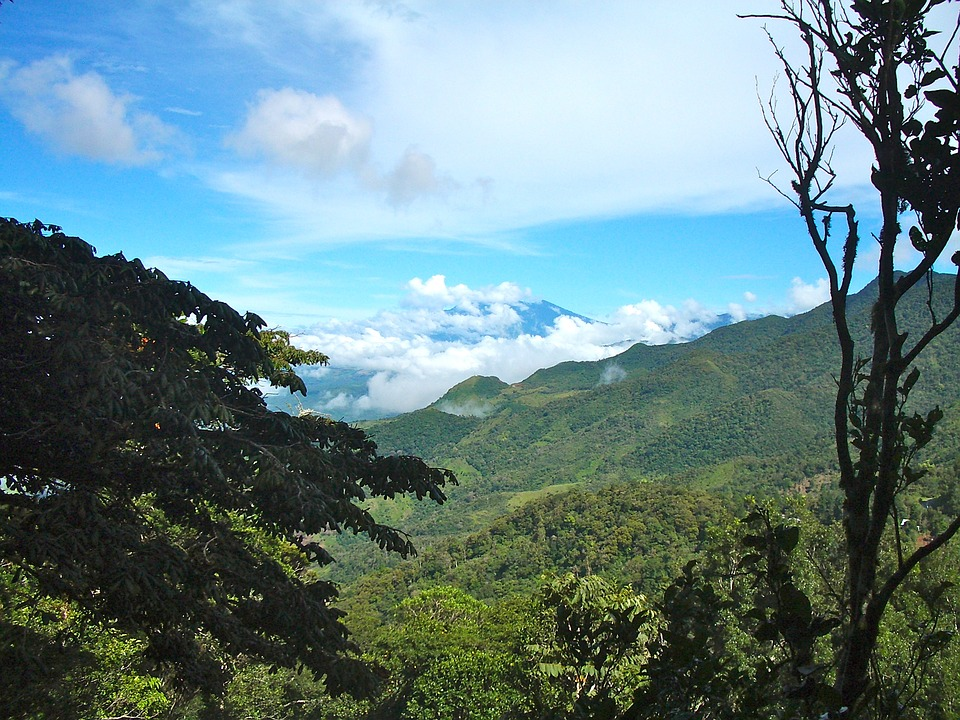
- Montane forests of Panama

Ecology
- Realm: Neotropical
- Biome: Tropical and subtropical moist broadleaf forests

Geography
- Area: 3,108 km^{2} (1,200 sq mi)
- Countries: Colombia, Panama
- Coordinates: 7.768°N 77.731°W
- Geology: Chocó Basin
- Climate type: Af: equatorial; fully humid

Conservation
- Conservation status: Relatively stable/intact
- Protected: 75.193%

The Eastern Panamanian montane forests (NT0122) is an ecoregion in the east of Panama and the extreme northwest of Colombia. It contains diverse flora and fauna, with considerable endemism. The ecoregion is largely intact due to its inaccessibility, although the opening of an extension of the Pan-American Highway has introduced threats from human activity.

== Geography ==
=== Location ===
Location in Panama

The ecoregion covers several separate areas of higher ground in Panama and the adjoining border region of Colombia. It has an area of 310,798 hectares (768,000 acres). In the east, the ecoregion is found in mountains surrounded by Chocó–Darién moist forests. Further west it is found on mountains surrounded by Isthmian–Atlantic moist forests..

=== Terrain ===
The region is one where the Caribbean Plate is riding over the Nazca Plate and the Cocos Plate, causing tectonic instability and volcanic activity. The Cordillera de San Blas and the Serranía del Darién are in the northeast, the latter containing the 1,875 metres (6,152 ft) Cerro Tacarcuna. The south holds isolated chains of mountains such as the Serranía de Majé, Serrania de Jungurudó, the Serranía de Bagre and the Serranía del Baudó beside the Pacific coast. The Eastern Panamanian montane forests ecoregion lies at elevations above 500 metres (1,600 ft).

=== Climate ===
Annual rainfall is typically 3,000 to 4,000 millimetres (120 to 160 in). The central mountains receive less rain, averaging 1,700 to 2,800 millimetres (67 to 110 in) while the mountains along the Caribbean coast receive 4,000 to 5,000 millimetres (160 to 200 in). At a sample location at 8.25°N 77.75°W the Köppen climate classification is Af: equatorial; fully humid. Mean temperatures range from 26 °C (79 °F) in November to 27.3 °C (81.1 °F) in March. Annual rainfall is about 1,600 millimetres (63 in). Monthly rainfall varies from 12.7 millimetres (0.50 in) in March to 27.7 millimetres (1.09 in) in August.

== Ecology ==
The ecoregion is in the neotropical realm, in the tropical and subtropical moist broadleaf forests biome.

=== Flora ===
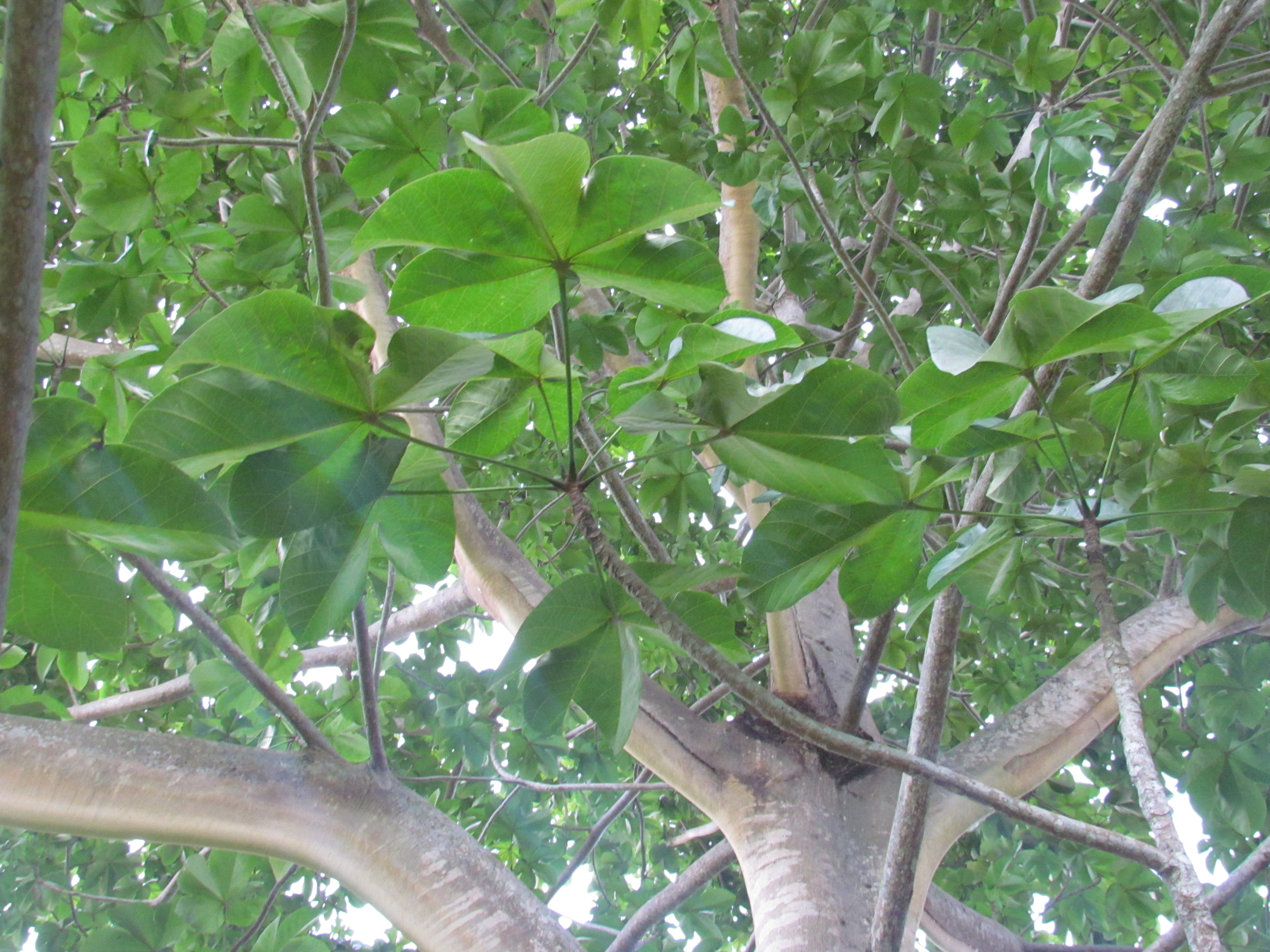
Panama tree (Sterculia apetala)

The forests grow at elevations from 500–1,800 metres (1,600–5,900 ft) in the Darién Province. At the upper levels the trees give way to páramo grasslands. The forests are complex, with great diversity and considerable endemism. Types of vegetation at the lower levels include semi-deciduous tropical moist forest, the most common form, as well as swamp forests and marshes. The semi-deciduous forest canopy trees include pochote (Pachira quinata), yuco de monte (Pachira sessilis), guanacaste (Enterolobium cyclocarpum), Licania hypoleuca, Platypodium elegans, ceibo barrigón (Pseudobombax septenatum), Panama tree (Sterculia apetala), nargusta (Terminalia amazonia), Tetragastris panamensis and taruma (Vitex cymosa).

At higher elevations the dominant canopy tree in the premontane and montane wet forests is wild cashew (Anacardium excelsum). Other common canopy trees include Bombacopsis species, snakewood (Brosimum guianense), kapok tree (Ceiba pentandra), Cochlospermum orinocense, almendro (Dipteryx panamensis) and balsam of Peru (Myroxylon balsamum). Quercus humboldtii is present in the Serranía del Darién. Mapora palm (Oenocarpus mapora) is the dominant sub-canopy tree and Mabea occidentalis is the dominant shrub in the understory. Above 750 metres (2,460 ft) there are cloud forests dominated by mapora palm. Higher up there are elfin forests dominated by Clusia species.

=== Fauna ===
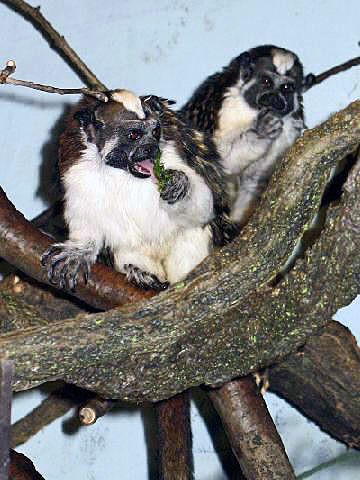
The endemic Geoffroy's tamarin (Saguinus geoffroyi)

The Eastern Panamanian montane forests ecoregion, situated on the land bridge between the Americas, and with different elevations and climates, has diverse fauna. Species from the north and south have mixed, and endemic species have appeared. Darien Province has about 770 species of vertebrates. Primates are gray-bellied night monkey (Aotus lemurinus – at the northern end of its range), Geoffroy's spider monkey (Ateles geoffroyi), black-headed spider monkey (Ateles fusciceps), Geoffroy's tamarin (Saguinus geoffroyi – endemic to Costa Rica, Panama and northwest Colombia), mantled howler (Alouatta palliata) and white-headed capuchin (Cebus capucinus). Cats are cougar (Puma concolor), jaguar (Panthera onca), ocelot (Leopardus pardalis), margay (Leopardus wiedii), jaguarundi (Puma yagouaroundi) and oncilla (Leopardus tigrinus). Endangered mammals include black-headed spider monkey, Geoffroy's spider monkey and Baird's tapir (Tapirus bairdii).

The ecoregion is the northernmost area for South American birds such as saffron-headed parrot (Pyrilia pyrilia), oilbird (Steatornis caripensis) and golden-headed quetzal (Pharomachrus auriceps). Endemic birds to the ecoregion also inhabit the Choco-Darién moist forests to the south. The restricted range birds are found at elevations from 700 to 800 metres (2,300 to 2,600 ft). They include the bare-shanked screech owl (Megascops clarkii), beautiful treerunner (Margarornis bellulus), blue-and-gold tanager (Bangsia arcaei), green-naped tanager (Tangara fucosa), Nariño tapaculo (Scytalopus vicinior), Pirre hummingbird (Goldmania bella), Pirre warbler (Basileuterus ignotus), russet-crowned quail-dove (Zentrygon goldmani), sooty-faced finch (Arremon crassirostris), Tacarcuna bush tanager (Chlorospingus tacarcunae), Tacarcuna tapaculo (Scytalopus panamensis), Tacarcuna wood quail (Odontophorus dialeucos), varied solitaire (Myadestes coloratus), violet-capped hummingbird (Goldmania violiceps) and yellow-collared chlorophonia (Chlorophonia flavirostris).

There are 24 species of endangered amphibians and reptiles in the Darién National Park. Endangered amphibians include the horned marsupial frog (Gastrotheca cornuta).

== Status ==
The World Wide Fund for Nature (WWF) gives the ecoregion the status "Relatively Stable/Intact". It has avoided widespread damage due to its steep and inaccessible slopes, and there are still large, intact blocks. However, the opening of the Pan-American Highway has caused colonization from central Panama, with increases in slash-and-burn farming, gold mining and the illegal capture of macaws, parrots, and passerine birds for sale.

The ridge of the San Blas Range is in the Guna Indian Reserve of San Blas, and Narganá Wilderness Area is a protected area administered by the indigenous Guna people. The 5,790 square kilometres (2,240 sq mi) Darién National Park protects a large area of the ecoregion. Other protected areas are the Guna de Walá Mortí, Nurrá and Comarca Emberá-Wounaan indigenous reserves, the 316 square kilometres (122 sq mi) Canglon Forest Reserve and the 1,460 square kilometres (560 sq mi) Chepigana Forest Reserve.
