= Tapiche Reserve =

Peruvian nature reserve

- Interactive map of Tapiche Reserve
- Location: Tapiche District, Requena Province, Peru
- Coordinates: 5.63416°S 73.98344°W
- Area: 18,803 ha (72.60 sq mi)

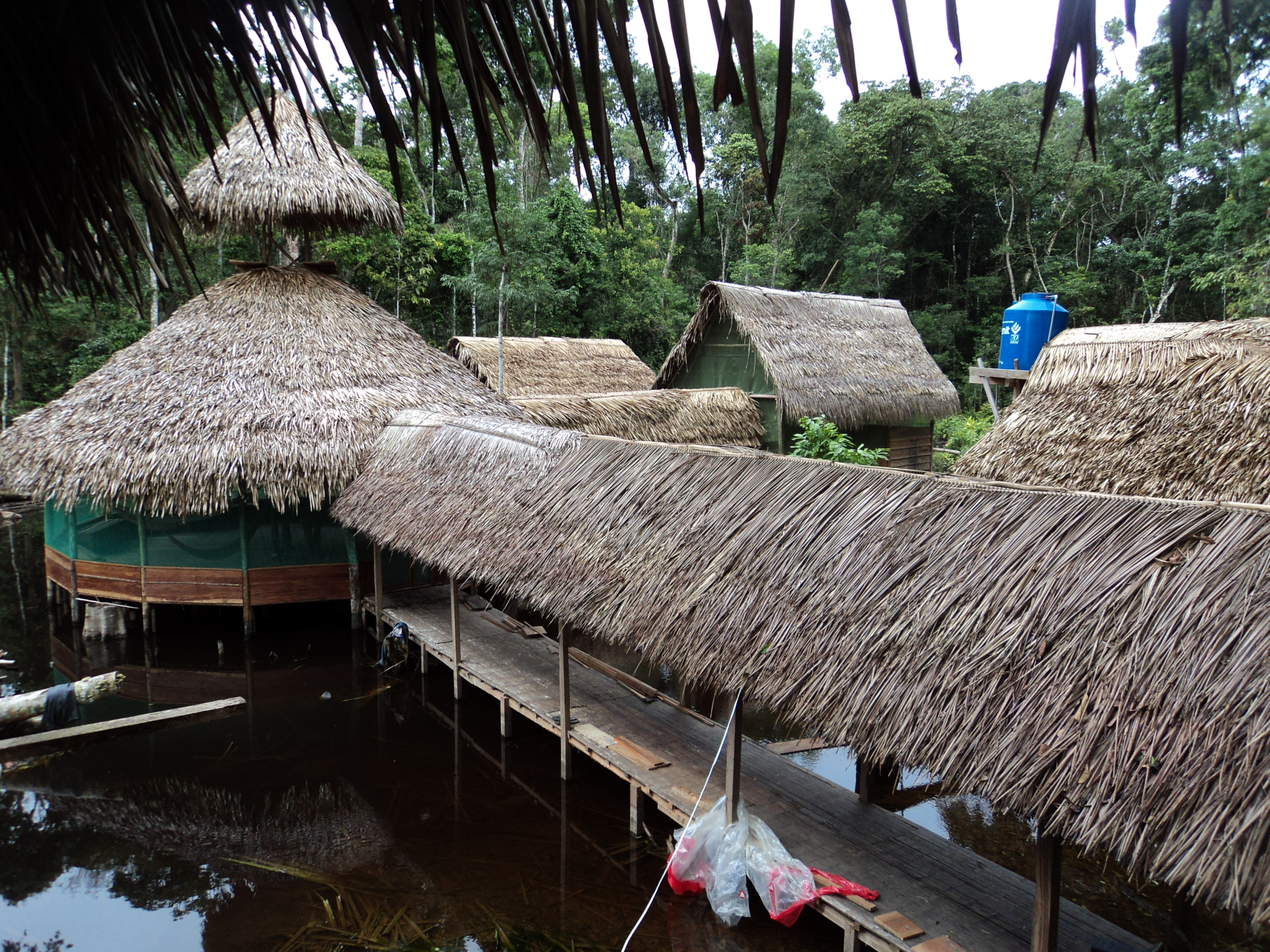
Village at the reserve

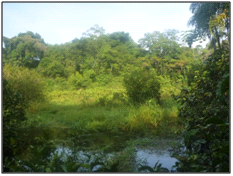
Lowland amazon landscape

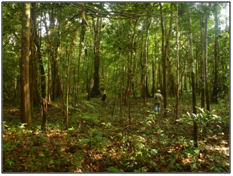
Lowland forest

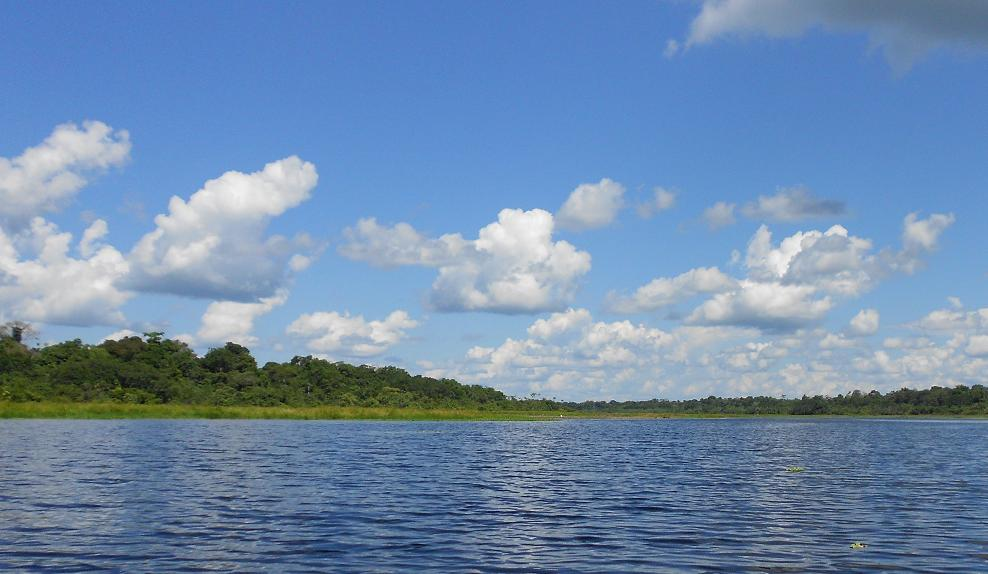
Rio Tapiche

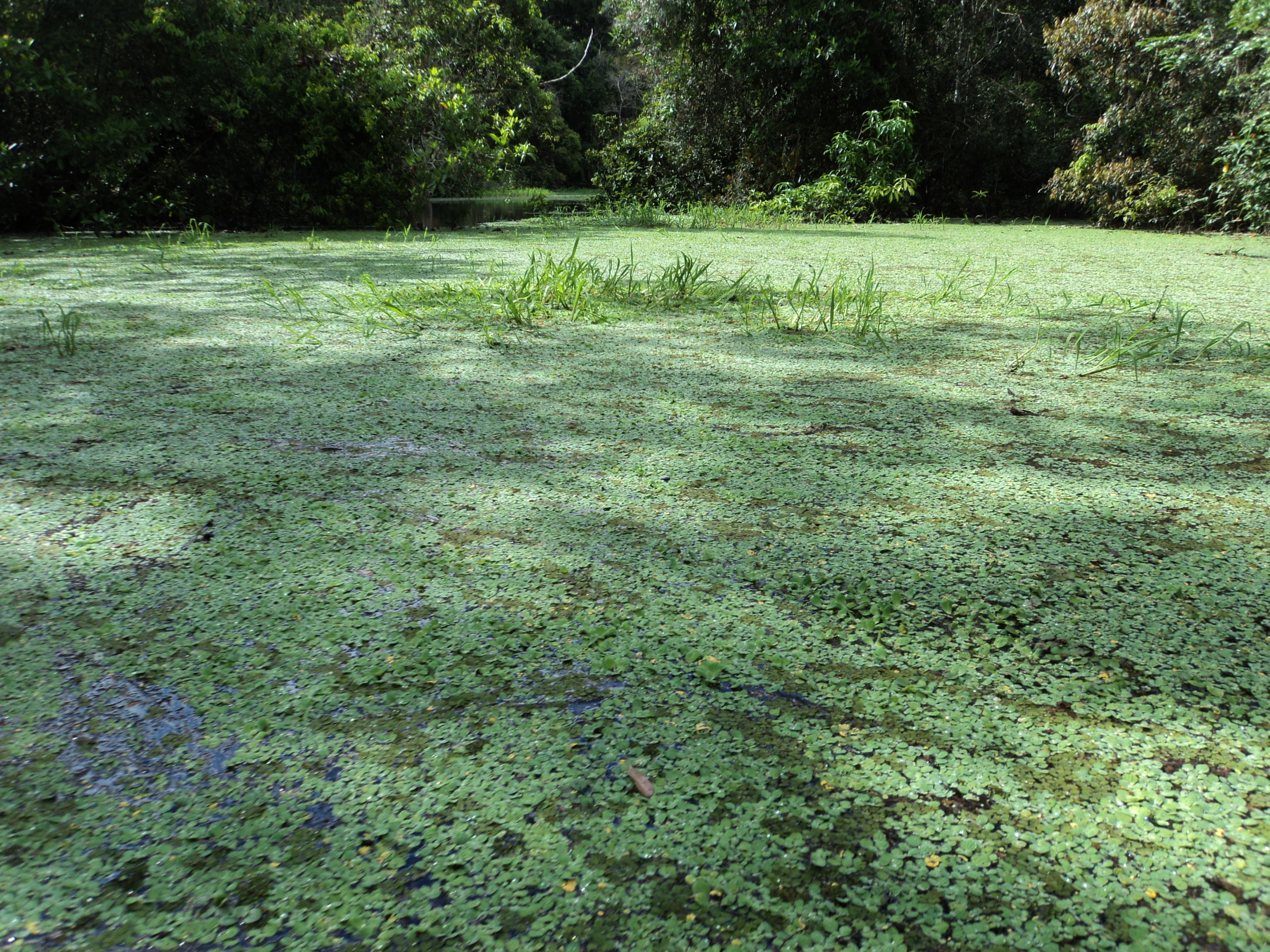
Quebrada chambiria

The Tapiche Reserve is a private conservation property located in Tapiche District, Requena Province, Loreto Region in Peru. The reserve is designated by the Peruvian government as a Private Conservation Area (PCA).

== Geography ==
The reserve encompasses an area of approximately 18,803 hectares, in the Tapiche River basin, spanning both sides of the river east of the Ucayali River. It is located 340 km up river from Iquitos on the Tapiche River, and is accessible only by waterway. The Blanco and Umaita Rivers empty into the Tapiche River in the basin area. Other tributaries are the Contea, Capanahua, and Lamayacu Rivers.

The reserve comprises several types of lowland Amazonian forests, including igapo, varzea, and terra firme. It is one of the few areas in the Amazon basin where these forest types can be found in close proximity. The Tapiche River basin in the area of the reserve exhibits a landscape containing alluvial plains and associated floodplains. The floodplains of the alluvial landscape encompass swamps or aguajales; while the non-flooded plains appear as undulating terraces. There are hilly landscapes within the reserve which appear as gently sloping lowland terrain. Swamps have developed on flat land and in depressions formed by fibric histosol soils with pH values varying between 3.5 and 5.

=== Hydrography ===
The Tapiche River is regarded as a "black water" river because of its dark sepia waters. Possessing little material in suspension, its color comes from the decomposition of organic material forming humic and fulvic acids. These waters are acidic, with pH around 4.0 and a temperature from 24 °C (75 °F) to 32.0 °C (90 °F). The Tapiche River has a strictly sub-Andean origin, which eliminates a direct relationship with rainfall in the mountains. Within the reserve there are small bodies of water (oxbows, channels, meanders, restingas and lakes) that communicate with each other and with the Tapiche River. Channels that connect curved river-bends create navigable shortcuts during flooded season. The largest internal body of water is called Quebrada Chambiria. Quebrada Chambiria has little flow which creates habitat for a host of species.

== Climate ==
It has annual temperatures ranging from 25 °C (77 °F) to 33 °C (91 °F) with relative humidity of 78% to 96%. In the rainy season from October to May there is tropical rainfall. The average annual precipitation is 3 meters. During the months of June or July a particular weather phenomenon called a "cold spell" occurs in the region. The cold spell is related to penetration of air masses coming from the southern polar latitudes and entering the South American tropics shortly after reaching Southeast Brazil. This cold spell lasts about 2–4 days, where temperatures can reach 13 °C (55 °F).

== Biology and ecology ==
=== Fauna ===
The reserve is home to endangered species such as jaguar (Panthera onca), bald uakari (Cacajao calvus), giant armadillo (Priodontes maximus), the Brazilian tapir (Tapirus terrestris), the Amazonian manatee (Trichechus inunguis), and harpy eagle (Harpia harpyja). A land survey and rapid species inventory of Tapiche Ohara's Reserve was performed in 2011. The species inventory is reproduced below in table format.

=== Flora ===
Trees such as cedar (Cedrela odorata) and mahogany (Swietenia macrophylla) can be found in its forests. There four representative botanical families in its swamps, including: Moraceae, Fabaceae, Annonaceae and Arecaceae. Also found are catahua (Hura crepitans), strangler fig (Ficus sp.), machimango (Eschweilera sp.), and caupuri (Virola pavonis), aguaje (Mauritia flexuosa), shapaja (Attalea phalerata), cashapona (Socratea exorrhiza), renaco (Ficus trigona), espintana (Oxandra espintana) and huimba (Pachira aquatica).

=== Aquatic ecosystems ===
The reserve houses ecosystems formed by conditions that create microhabitats. The ecosystems present on the reserve encompass cochas and tahuampas. Primary plant species found in these aquatic ecosystems are species belonging to the family Poaceae; especially the Gramalote blanco (Paspalum fasciculatum) and others of the genera Echinochloa and Paspalum. Also present is caña brava (Gynerium sagittatum), water hyacinth (putu putu, Eichhornia crassipes), and huama (Pistia stratiotes).

Fauna and fauna of Tapiche Reserve

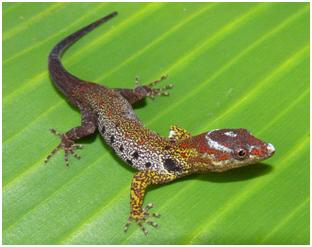
Sphaerodactylidae

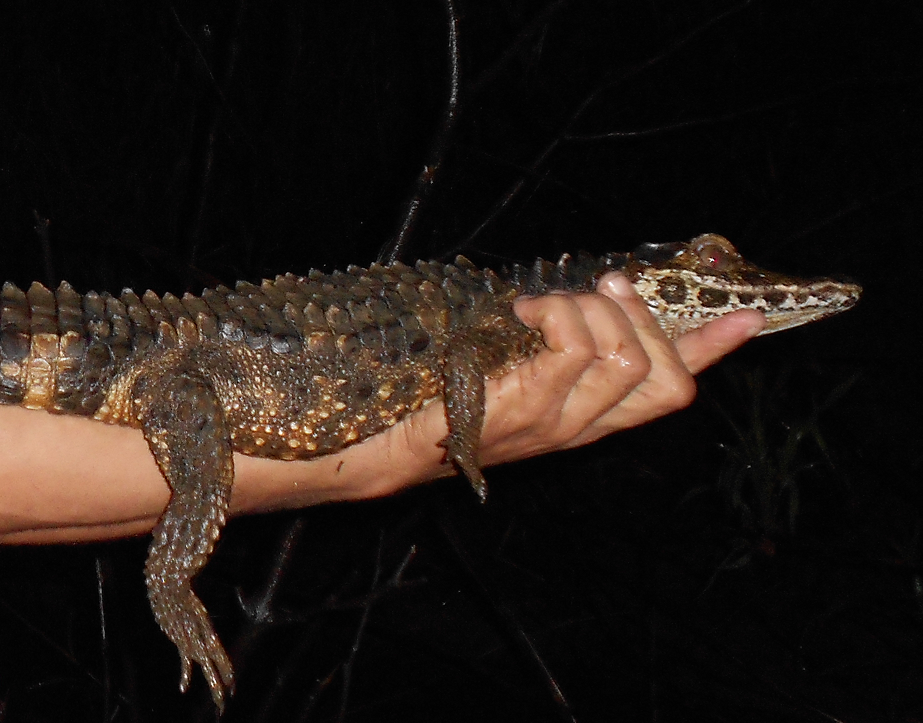
Lagarta

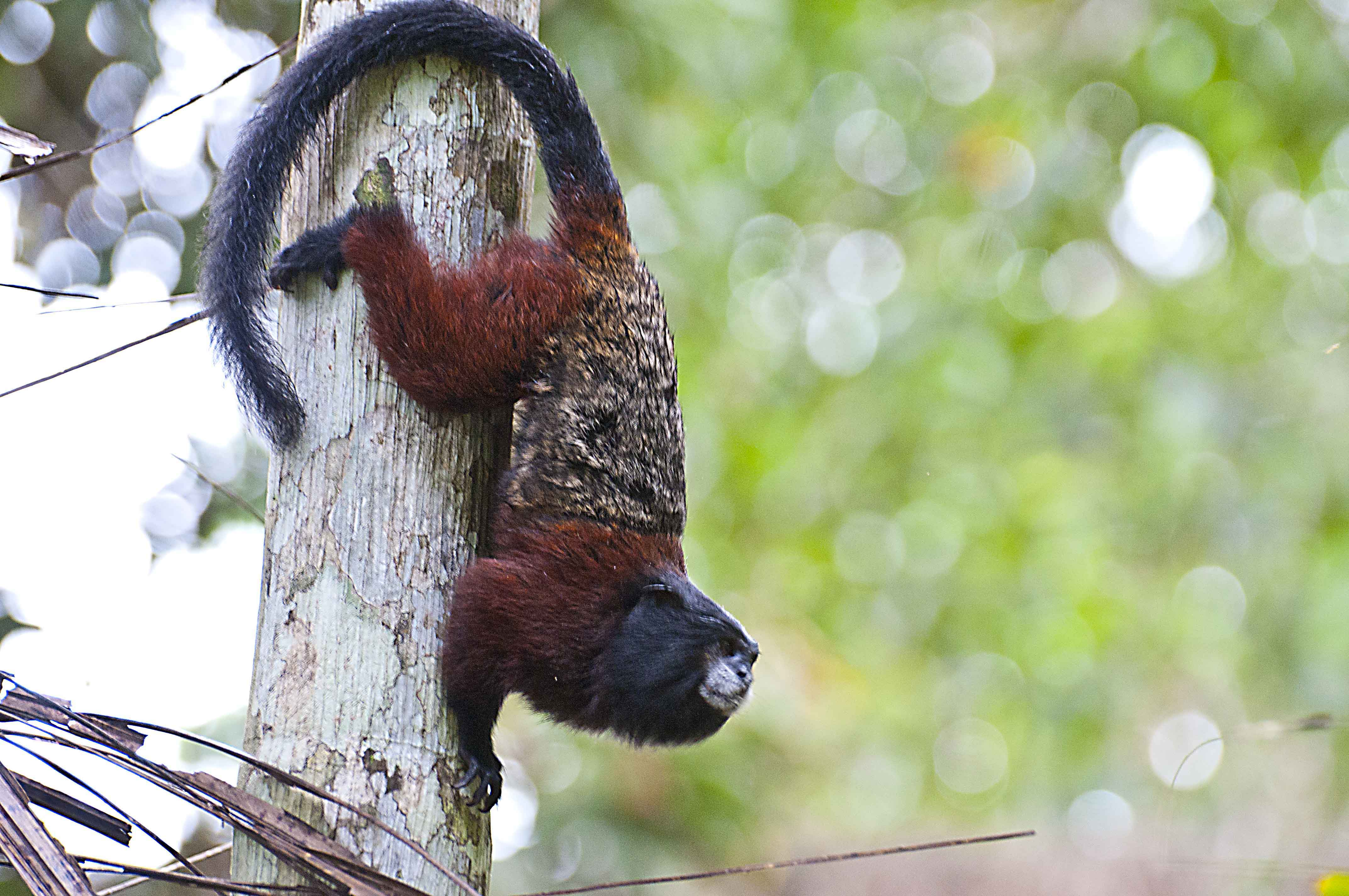
Tamarin

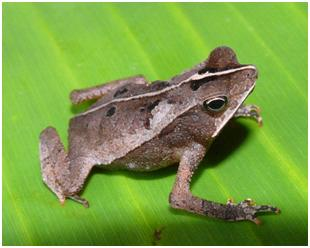
Bufonidae

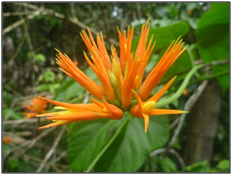
Orange Blossom

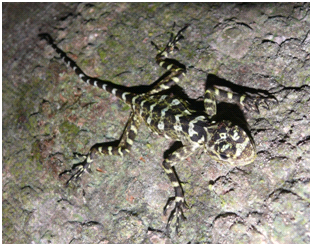
Plica plica

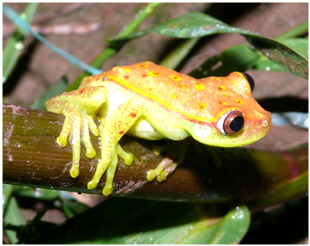
Hypsiboas punctatus

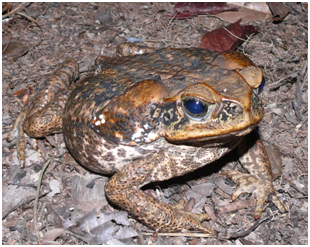
Rhinella marina

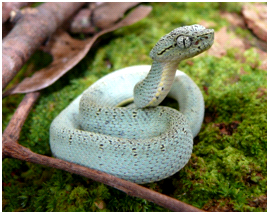
Bothriopsis bilineata

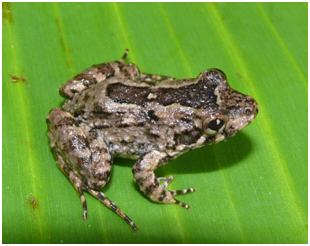
Leptodactylus petersii

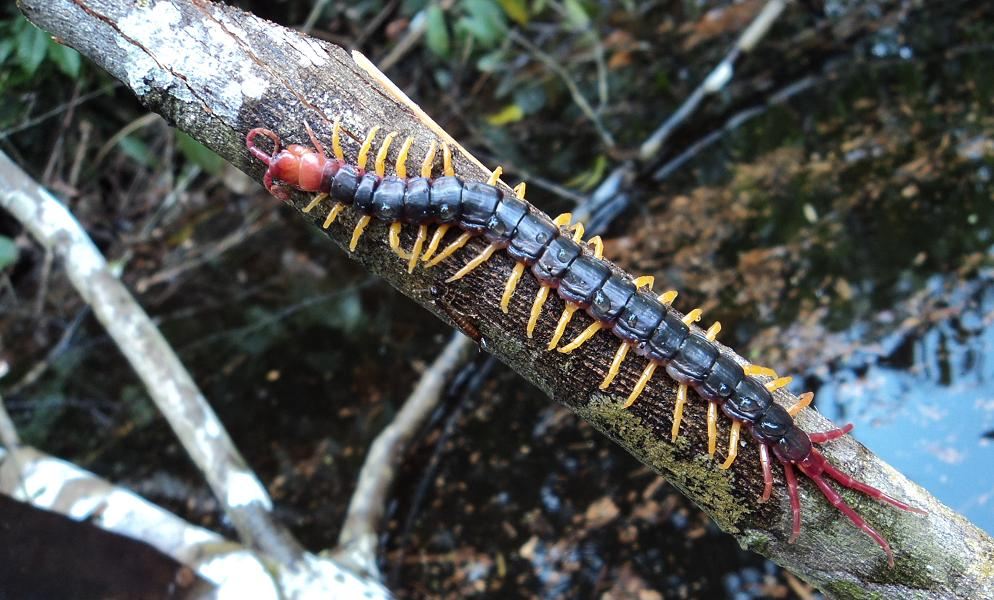
Amazon centipede

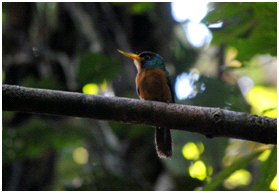
Jacamar cara azul

== Table of flora (2011) ==
Scientific name	Family	Peruvian name	Use
Abuta grandifolia	Menispermaceae	Abuta	medicine (roots, bark, leaves)
Alchornea castaneifolia	Euphorbiaceae	Ipururo	medicine (roots, bark, leaves)
Aniba williamsii	Lauraceae	Moena amarilla	wood
Annona muricata	Annonaceae	Guanábana	food (fruit), medicine (bark, roots, leaves)
Apeiba membranacea	Tiliaceae	Peine de mono	animal food, fuel, seed oil
Aspidosperma rigidum	Apocynaceae	Remocaspi de bajial	wood, tools
Astrocaryum chambira	Arecaceae	Chambira	food, medicine, crafts
Astrocaryum jauari	Arecaceae	Huiririma, Chambirilla	wood, food, crafts
Astrocaryum javarense	Arecaceae	Huicungo	animal food, crafts
Attalea butyracea	Arecaceae	Shebon	wood, thatching, animal food, crafts
Attalea phalerata	Arecaceae	Shapaja	thatching, food, crafts
Bactris concinna	Arecaceae	Ñejilla, Chontilla	wood, food, crafts
Bactris gasipaes	Arecaceae	Mansoa	wood, food, medicine (root), dyes
Bactris maraja	Arecacea	Ñeja, Ñejilla, Chontilla	crafts
Bactris simplisifrons	Arecaceae	Ñejilla, Chontilla	tools
Banisteriopsis caapi	Malpighiceae	Ayahuasca	medicine
Bixa orellana	Bixaceae	Achiote	medicine, animal food, dyes
Brosimum acutifolium	Moraceae	Mururé	medicine (resin, bark)
Brosimum rubescens	Moraceae	Palisangre	wood, animal food, medicine (bark), crafts
Brunfelsia grandiflora	Solanaceae	Chiric Sanango	medicine (root, bark), ornamentation
Calathea lutea	Maranthaceae	Bijao	cooking
Calophyllum brasiliense	Clusiaceae	Lagarto caspi	wood, animal food, medicine (oil), dyes
Calycophyllum spruceanum	Rubiaceae	Capirona	wood, fuel, medicine
Campomanesia lineatifolia	Myrtaceae	Palillo	food, medicine (bark), fuel
Campsiandra angustifolia	Fabaceae	Huacapurana	medicine (bark)
Caryocar glabrum	Caryocaraceae	Almendro	wood, food
Cecropia membranacea	Cecropiaceae	Cetico	animal food, tools
Cedrela odorata	Meliaceae	Cedro	wood, medicine (bark), ornamentation
Cedrelinga cateniformis	Fabaceae	Tornillo	wood
Ceiba pentandra	Malvaceae	White lupuna	wood
Chelyocarpus ulei	Arecaceae	Sacha aguajillo	animal food, crafts, ornamentation
Chrysophyllum argenteum	Sapotaceae	Balata	food, tools
Chrysophyllum bombycinum	Sapotaceae	Balatillo	animal food
Clusia rosea	Clusiaceae	Renaquilla	wood, medicine (resin), medicine (bark)
Copaifera paupera	Fabaceae	Copaiba	wood, food, medicine (oil), fuel, soaps
Couepia subcordata	Chrysobalanaceae	Parinari	wood, food, crafts, ornamentation
Couroupita guianensis	Lecythidaceae	Ayahuma	medicine
Coutarea hexandra	Rubiaceae	Guacamayo caspi	fuel, tools
Crescentia cujete	Bignoniaceae	Huingo	medicine, crafts
Dalechampia dioscoreifolia	Euphorbiaceae	Sapo huasca	medicine (resin)
Diplotropis purpurea	Fabaceae	Chontaquiro	wood, tools
Dipteryx micrantha	Fabaceae	Charapilla	wood, animal food
Doliocarpus dentatus	Dilleniaceae	Paujil chaqui	animal food, medicine
Dracontium loretense	Araceae	Jergón Sacha	medicine
Duguetia spixiana	Annonaceae	Tortuga Caspi	wood, animal food
Duroia hirsuta	Rubiaceae	Huitillo	animal food, dyes
Eichhornia crassipes	Pontederiaceae	Putu putu	ornamentation
Erythrina fusca	Fabaceae	Amasisa	medicine (bark), ornamentation
Eschweilera juruensis	Lecythidaceae	Machimango	wood, animal food, crafts
Eugenia stipitata	Myrtaceae	Arazà	food
Euterpe precatoria	Arecaceae	Huasaí	wood, food, medicine (root), crafts
Ficus americana	Moraceae	Renaco	animal food
Ficus insipida	Moraceae	Ojé	wood, medicine (resin)
Ficus schultesii	Moraceae	Ojé renaco	wood
Garcinia macrophylla	Clusiaceae	Charichuelo	wood, food, ornamentation
Genipa americana	Rubiaceae	Huito	food, medicine, crafts
Guatteria elata	Annonaceae	Carahuasca	wood, ornamentation
Guazuma crinita	Sterculiaceae	Bolaina blanca	wood
Guazuma ulmifolia	Sterculiaceae	Bolaina	wood
Gustavia longifolia	Lecythidaceae	Chopé	food, fuel
Gynerium sagittatum	Poaceae	Caña Brava	medicine, tools, crafts
Haploclathra cordata	Calophyllaceae	Boa caspi	wood
Heliconia stricta	Heliconiaceae	Heliconia, situlli	ornamentation
Heliconia acuminata	Heliconiaceae	Heliconia, situlli	ornamentation
Hevea brasiliensis	Euphorbiaceae	Shiringa	wood
Hura crepitans	Euphorbiaceae	Catahua	wood, medicine (resin), tools
Himatanthus sucuuba	Apocynaceae	Bellaco caspi	wood, medicine (resin), fuel
Hymenaea oblongifolia	Fabaceae	Azúcar huayo	wood, animal food, medicine (bark)
Inga edulis	Fabaceae	Guaba	food, fuel
Inga sp.	Fabaceae	Shimbillo	food
Iriartea deltoidea	Arecacea	Huacrapona	wood, food, crafts
Iryanthera sp.	Myristicaceae	Cumala colorada	wood
Iryanthera tricornis	Myristicaceae	Perro caspi	wood
Jacaranda copaia	Bignoniaceae	Huamanzamana	wood, medicine (bark)
Laportea aestuans	Urticaceae	Ishanga colorada	medicine
Lecythis pisonis	Lecythidaceae	Olla de mono	wood, animal food
Lonchocarpus utilis	Fabaceae	Barbasco	poison
Maclura tinctoria	Moraceae	Incira	wood, animal food, medicine (resin), dyes
Macoubea guianensis	Apocynaceae	Coto huayo	animal food, medicine
Macrolobium acaciifolium	Fabaceae	Aguano pashaco	wood
Mangifera indica	Anacardiaceae	Mangua dulce	animal food
Manilkara bidendata	Sapotaceae	Quinilla colorada	wood, crafts
Mansoa hymennea	Bignoniaceae	Ajo sacha macho	medicine
Maquira coriacea	Moraceae	Capinurí	wood, animal food, medicine (resin), crafts
Matisia cordata	Malvaceae	Sapote	food
Mauritia flexuosa	Arecaceae	Aguaje	wood, fruit, crafts
Mauritiella aculeata	Arecaceae	Aguajillo	food, tools, ornamentation
Maximiliana inaripa	Arecaceae	Shapajilla	animal food
Maytenus macrocarpa	Celastraceae	Chuchuhuasi	medicine (bark), fuel
Mezilaurus itauba	Lauraceae	Itauba	wood
Micropholis sp.	Sapotaceae	Quinilla	wood
Minquartia guianensis	Olacaceae	Huacapú	wood, animal food, medicine (bark), crafts
Myrciaria dubia	Myrtaceae	Camu camu	food
Ochroma pyramidale	Bombacaceae	Topa	wood, medicine, ornamentation
Ocotea aciphylla	Lauraceae	Moena canela	wood, medicine (oil)
Ocotea guianensis	Lauraceae	Moena colorada	wood
Ocotea undulate	Lauraceae	Isma moena	wood
Oenocarpus mapora	Arecaceae	Sinamillo	thatching, food, crafts
Ormosia coccinea	Fabaceae	Huayruro	wood, medicine, crafts
Oxandra espintana	Annonaceae	Espintana	wood
Pachira aquatica	Bombacaceae	Huimba	wood, food, ornamentation
Pachira insignis	Bombacaceae	Sacha pandisho	ornamentation
Paspalum fasciculatum	Poaceae	Gramalote blanco	animal food
Parkia multijuga	Fabaceae	Pashaco curtidor	wood
Philodendron lechlerianum	Araceae	Itininga	medicine (root)
Phthirusa adunca	Loranthaceae	Suelda con suelda	medicine
Phyllanthus urinaria	Euphorbiaceae	Chanca piedra	medicine
Physalis angulata	Solanaceae	Bolsa Mullaca	medicine
Phytelephas macrocarpa	Arecaceae	Yarina	thatching, food, medicine (bark), crafts
Piper aduncum	Piperaceae	Cordoncillo	medicine
Piper peltatum	Píperaceae	Santa maria	medicine
Poraqueiba serícea	Icacinaceae	Umarí Witoto	wood, food, fuel, tools
Pourouma cecropiifolia	Moraceae	Uvilla	wood, food, animal food, ornamentation
Pouteria caimito	Sapotaceae	Caimito	wood, food, medicine, tools
Pouteria macrocarpa	Sapotaceae	Lúcuma	wood, food, fuel
Pouteria neglecta	Sapotaceae	Caimitillo	wood, fuel
Pouteria reticulata	Sapotaceae	Quinilla blanca	wood, animal food
Pseudolmedia laevis	Moraceae	Chimicua	wood
Pistia stratiotes	Araceae	Huama	ornamentation, habitat
Salvia palaefolia	Lamiaceae	Oreja de perro	animal food, medicine
Smilax aspera	Smilacaceae	Zarzaparrilla	medicine (root)
Socratea exorrhiza	Arecaceae	Cashapona	wood, medicine (bark), crafts
Solanum sessiliflorum	Solanaceae	Cocona	food, medicine
Spondias mombin	Anacardiaceae	Ubos	food, medicine (bark)
Sterculia apetala	Sterculiaceae	Huarmi caspi	wood, animal food, medicine (root), tools
Swartzia polyphylla	Fabaceae	Cumaceba	medicine (bark)
Swietenia macrophylla	Meliaceae	Caoba aguano	wood, medicine (bark)
Syzygium malaccense	Myrtaceae	Pomarosa	animal food, fuel
Tabernaemontana sananho	Apocynaceae	Sanango	medicine (root)
Tachigali tessmannii	Fabaceae	Tangarana	medicine (bark)
Terminalia oblonga	Combretaceae	Yacushapana	wood
Theobroma bicolor	Sterculiaceae	Macambo	food, fuel, crafts
Theobroma cacao	Sterculiaceae	Cacao	food
Theobroma grandiflora	Sterculiaceae	Copoazú	food
Theobroma subincanum	Sterculiaceae	Cacahuillo	wood, animal food, fuel
Trema micrantha	Ulmaceae	Atadijo	medicine
Tynanthus panurensis	Bignoniaceae	Clavo huasca	medicine (bark)
Uncaria tomentosa	Rubiaceae	Uña de gato	medicine (bark)
Unonopsis floribunda	Annonaceae	Icoja	wood, medicine (bark)
Vanilla planifolia	Orchidaceae	Vainilla	food, ornamentation
Vatairea guianensis	Fabaceae	Marupá del bajo, Mari mari	wood, fuel
Virola sebifera	Myristicaceae	Cumala blanca	wood, animal food, candels (oil)
Wettinia augusta	Arecaceae	Sacha pona, ponilla	thatching, medicine, tools

== Table of Fauna (2011) ==
Scientific name	Family	Names
Accipiter poliogaster	Accipitridae	Grey-bellied goshawk
Alouatta seniculus	Cebidae	Red howler monkey, Coto
Amazona farinosa	Psittacidae	Mealy parrot
Aotus nancymae	Cebidae	Musmuqui
Ara ararauna	Psittacidae	Guacamayo azul y amarillo, blue and yellow macaw
Ara chloroptera	Psittacidae	Guacamayo rojo, red macaw
Aratinga leucophthalma	Psittacidae	White-eyed parakeet
Aratinga weddellii	Psittacidae	Dusky-headed parakeet
Ateles belzebuth	Cebidae	Maquisapa ceniza, white-bellied spider monkey
Ateles paniscus	Cebidae	Black spider monkey, maquisapa negro
Brotogeris sanctithomae	Psittacidae	Tui parakeet
Brotogeris versicolurus	Psittacidae	Pihuicho
Cacajao calvus	Callitrichidae	Bald-headed uakari, huapo colorado, red uakari
Caiman crocodilus	Alligatoridae	Lagarto blanco, caiman
Callicebus torquatus	Pitheciidae	Tocon negro, collared titi
Cebus albifrons	Cebidae	Machin blanco, white-fronted capuchin monkey
Cebus apella	Cebidae	Machin negro
Choloepus didactylus	Megalonychidae	Pelejo de altura, two-toed sloth
Chondrohierax uncinatus	Accipitridae	Gavilan picudo, Hook-billed kite
Coendou prehensilis	Erethizontidae	Brazilian porcupine
Cuniculus paca	Cuniculidae	Paca
Daptrius ater	Falconidae	Black caracara
Dasyprocta fuliginosa	Dasyproctidae	Agouti
Dasypus kappleri	Dasypodidae	Carachupa, Armadillo
Eira barbara	Mustelidae	Tayra
Elanoides forficatus	Accipitridae	Gavilan tijereta, swallow-tailed kite
Harpagus bidentatus	Accipitridae	Double-toothed kite
Harpia harpyja	Accipitridae	Harpy eagle, Aguila harpia
Homo sapiens	Hominidae	Human
Hydrochaeris hydrochaeris	Hydrochaeridae	Capybara, ronosco
Ibycter americanus	Falconidae	Red-throated caracara
Ictinia plumbea	Accipitridae	Plumbeous kite
Inia geoffrensis	Delphinidae	Bufeo Colorado, pink dolphin, Amazon river dolphin
Lagothrix lagotricha	Cebidae	Yellow-tailed woolly monkey, choro
Leptodon cayanensis	Accipitridae	Gray-headed kite
Lutra longicaudis	Mustelidae	Otter
Mazama americana	Cervidae	Venado Colorado, red brocket deer
Micrastur buckleyi	Falconidae	Buckley forest-falcon
Micrastur gilvicollis	Falconidae	Lined forest-falcon
Micrastur mirandollei	Falconidae	Slaty-backed forest-falcon
Micrastur semitorquatus	Falconidae	Collared forest-falcon
Milvago chimachima	Falconidae	Shihuango, yellow-headed caracara
Morphnus guianensis	Accipitridae	Crested eagle
Myoprocta pratti	Dasyproctidae	Punchana
Nasua nasua	Procyonidae	Achuni
Orthopsittaca manilata	Psittacidae	Red-bellied macaw
Paleosuchus trigonatus	Alligatoridae	Dwarf lizard
Paleosuchus trigonatus	Alligatoridae	Black lizard
Panthera onca	Felidae	Otorongo, jaguar
Phyllomedusa tomopterna	Hylidae	Tiger-leg monkey-frog, Rana lemur naranja
Pionites leucogaster	Psittacidae	White-bellied parrot
Pionopsitta barrabandi	Psittacidae	Orange-cheeked parrot
Pionus menstruus	Psittacidae	Loro cabeza azul, blue-headed parrot
Pipa pipa	Pipidae	Charapa sapo, rana acuatica
Pithecia monachus	Cebidae	Huapo negro, black uakari
Podocnemis unifilis	Podocnemididae	Taricaya, yellow-spotted river turtle
Potos flavus	Procyonidae	Chozna, kinkajou
Priodontes maximus	Dasypodidae	Giant armadillo, Yangunturo, Carachupa mama
Proechimys sp.	Echimyidae	Spiny rat
Rostrhamus hamatus	Accipitridae	Slender-billed kite
Rostrhamus sociabilis	Accipitridae	Gavilan churero, snail kite
Saguinus fuscicollis	Callitrichidae	Pichio pardo, common pichio, saddle-back tamarin
Saimiri sciureus	Cebidae	Squirrel monkey
Sotalia fluviatilis	Delphinidae	Bufeo negro, gray dolphin
Speothos venaticus	Canidae	Sacha dog, bush dog
Spizaetus tyrannus	Accipitridae	Black hawk-eagle
Tamandua tetradactyla	Myrmecophagidae	Shihui, lesser anteater
Tapirus terrestris	Tapiridae	Tapir, sachavaca
Tayassu pecari	Tayassuidae	Huangana
Tayassu tajacu	Tayassuidae	Sajino
Trichechus inunguis	Trichechidae	Vaca marina, manatee
