= French peanut =

French peanut is a common name for several plants and may refer to:

- Pachira aquatica, also called Malabar chestnut
- Pachira glabra, also called Guinea peanut
