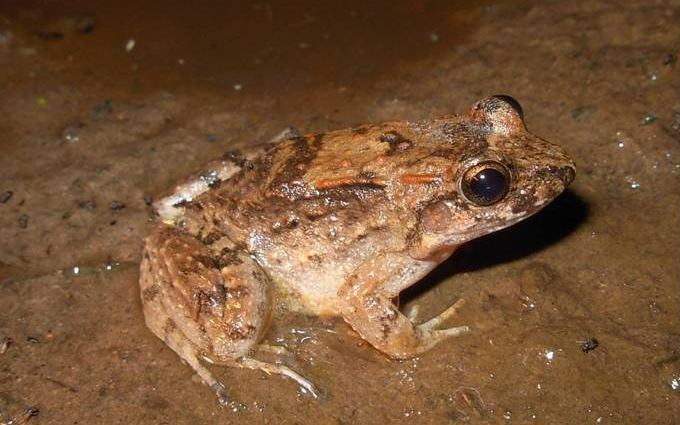

Conservation status
- Least Concern (IUCN 3.1)

Scientific classification
- Kingdom: Animalia
- Phylum: Chordata
- Class: Amphibia
- Order: Anura
- Family: Leptodactylidae
- Genus: Leptodactylus
- Species: L. petersii

Binomial name
- Leptodactylus petersii (Steindachner, 1864)

Synonyms
- Platymantis petersii Steindachner, 1864; Leptodactylus brevipes Cope, 1887; Leptodactylus intermedius Lutz, 1930

= Leptodactylus petersii =

Species of frog

Leptodactylus petersii (common name: Peters' thin-toed frog, in Spanish sapito de Peters, i.e. "Peters' toadlet") is a species of frog in the family Leptodactylidae. It is found widely in the Guianas and the Amazon Basin (Bolivia, Brazil, Colombia, Ecuador, French Guiana, Guyana, Peru, Suriname, and Venezuela). It has been confused with Leptodactylus podicipinus and Leptodactylus wagneri, complicating the interpretation of older records and accounts.

== Etymology ==
The specific name petersii honors Wilhelm Peters, a German zoologist.

== Description ==
Male Leptodactylus petersii measure 27–41 mm (1.1–1.6 in) and females 31–51 mm (1.2–2.0 in) in snout–vent length.

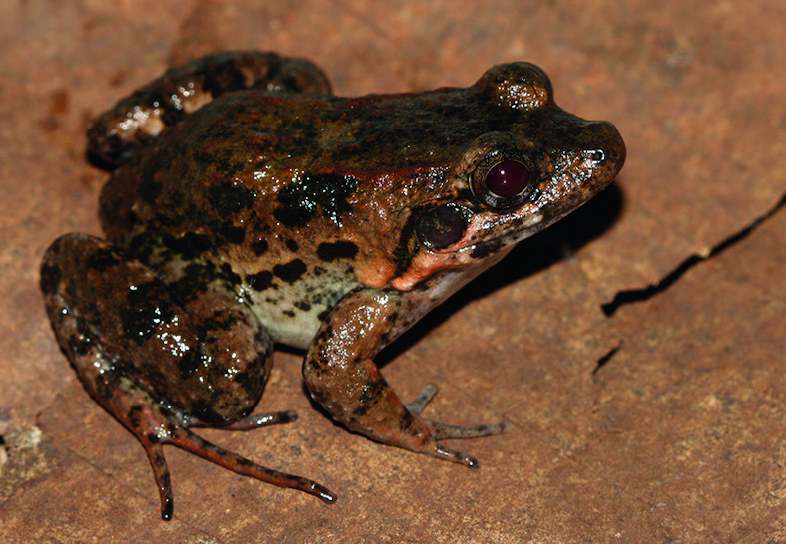
Amapá, Brazil

The dorsum ranges from greenish or greyish brown to reddish brown and has irregular dark brown to black markings. There is also a dark, triangular inter-orbital mark. The dorsum bears many spicules and short, laterally oriented glandular ridges. The ventrum smooth and has a variable pattern consisting of white background and extensive grey to black mottling in an anastomotic pattern. The throat is dark grey and has white spots. The tympanum is relatively large; the supratympanic fold is distinct and reaches arm insertion. The iris is bronze to reddish brown. Fingers have absent or only weak lateral fringes, whereas the fringes are extensive on toes, which also have basal webbing. Males have two large spines on their thumbs.

The tadpoles grow to a maximum total length of 21 mm (0.83 in), of which the tail accounts for 60% (Gosner stage 36).

== Habitat and conservation ==
Leptodactylus petersii are found in tropical rainforest, forest edge, open areas, savanna enclaves in the tropical rainforest, and open cerrado formations below 600 m (2,000 ft). This nocturnal frog is usually found on the ground near water. Eggs are laid in a foam nest near water, to which the tadpoles will later move.

This common species occurs in many protected areas and is not considered threatened by the IUCN.
