= U. floribunda =

U. floribunda may refer to:

- Ungeria floribunda, a plant endemic to Norfolk Island
- Unonopsis floribunda, a tree with dark bark
