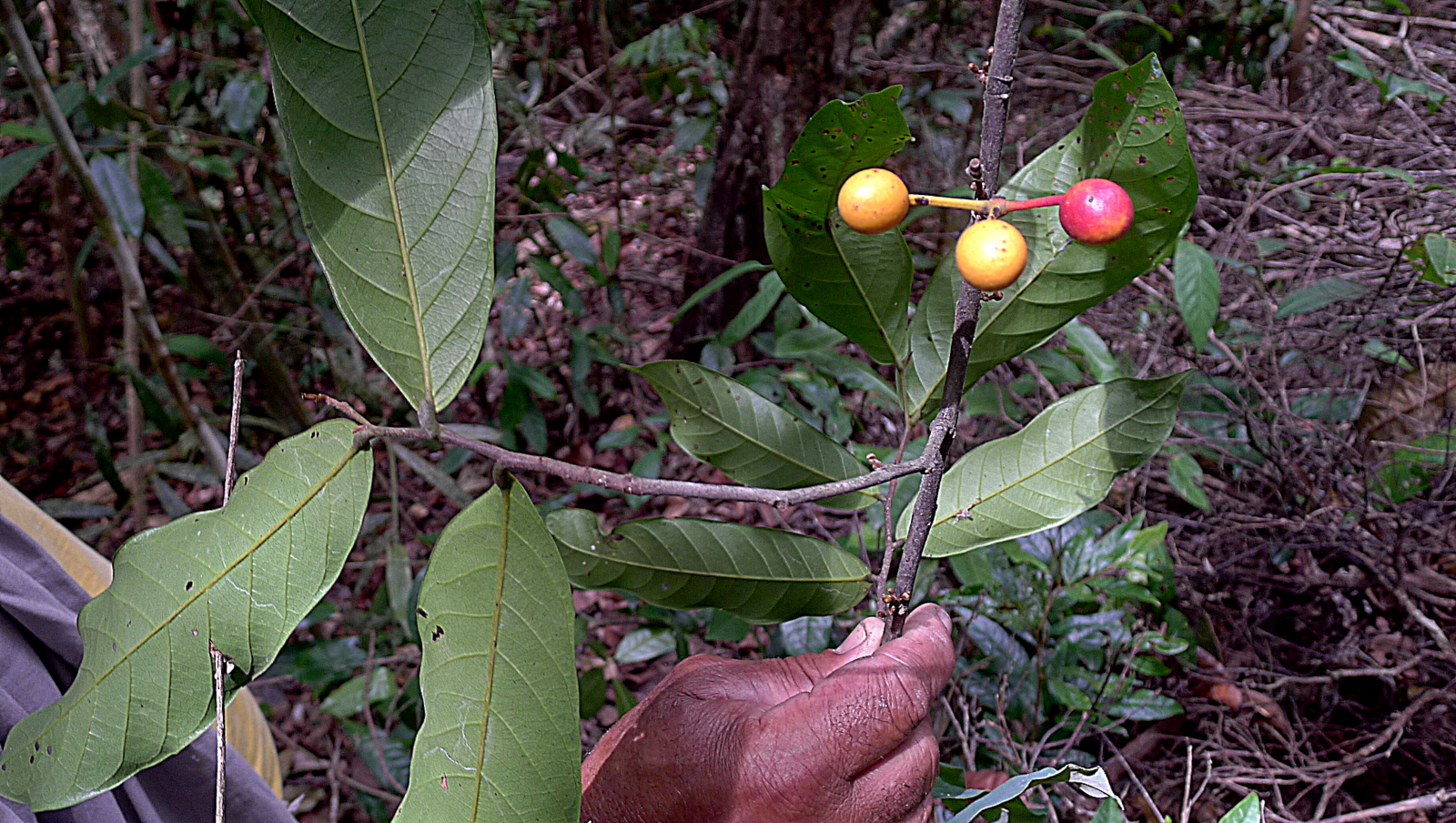
- Unonopsis bahiensis

Scientific classification
- Kingdom: Plantae
- Clade: Tracheophytes
- Clade: Angiosperms
- Clade: Magnoliids
- Order: Magnoliales
- Family: Annonaceae
- Genus: Unonopsis; R.E.Fr.

= Unonopsis =

Genus of flowering plants

Unonopsis is a genus of plants in the family Annonaceae native to southern Mexico and tropical America.

As of January 2025, Plants of the World Online accepts the following 48 species:

- Unonopsis asterantha Maas & Westra
- Unonopsis aurantiaca Maas & Westra
- Unonopsis aviceps Maas
- Unonopsis bahiensis Maas & Orava
- Unonopsis bauxitae Maas, Westra & Mello-Silva
- Unonopsis bullata Maas & G.E.Schatz
- Unonopsis cauliflora Maas & Westra
- Unonopsis colombiana Maas & Westra
- Unonopsis costanensis Maas & Westra
- Unonopsis costaricensis R.E.Fr.
- Unonopsis darienensis Maas & Westra
- Unonopsis duckei R.E.Fr.
- Unonopsis elegantissima R.E.Fr.
- Unonopsis esmeraldae Maas & Westra
- Unonopsis floribunda Diels
- Unonopsis glaucopetala R.E.Fr.
- Unonopsis guatterioides (A.DC.) R.E.Fr.
- Unonopsis hammelii G.E.Schatz & Maas
- Unonopsis heterotricha Maas & Westra
- Unonopsis longipes Maas & Westra
- Unonopsis macrocarpa Maas & Setten
- Unonopsis magnifolia R.E.Fr.
- Unonopsis megalophylla Maas & Westra
- Unonopsis megalosperma Maas & Westra
- Unonopsis mexicana Maas & Westra
- Unonopsis monticola Maas & Westra
- Unonopsis onychopetaloides Maas & Westra
- Unonopsis osae Maas & Westra
- Unonopsis pacifica R.E.Fr.
- Unonopsis panamensis R.E.Fr.
- Unonopsis penduliflora G.E.Schatz & Maas
- Unonopsis perrottetii (A.DC.) R.E.Fr.
- Unonopsis peruviana R.E.Fr.
- Unonopsis pittieri Saff.
- Unonopsis renatoi Maas & Westra
- Unonopsis riedeliana R.E.Fr.
- Unonopsis rufescens (Baill.) R.E.Fr.
- Unonopsis sanctae-teresae Maas & Westra
- Unonopsis sericea Maas & Westra
- Unonopsis sessilicarpa Maas & Westra
- Unonopsis silvatica R.E.Fr.
- Unonopsis spectabilis Diels
- Unonopsis stevensii G.E.Schatz
- Unonopsis stipitata Diels
- Unonopsis storkii Standl. & L.O.Williams
- Unonopsis theobromifolia N.Zamora & Pùveda
- Unonopsis umbilicata (Dunal) R.E.Fr.
- Unonopsis veneficiorum (Mart.) R.E.Fr.
