= Unonopsis spectabilis =

Conservation status
- Least Concern (IUCN 3.1)

Scientific classification
- Kingdom: Plantae
- Clade: Embryophytes
- Clade: Tracheophytes
- Clade: Spermatophytes
- Clade: Angiosperms
- Clade: Magnoliids
- Order: Magnoliales
- Family: Annonaceae
- Genus: Unonopsis
- Species: U. spectabilis

Binomial name
- Unonopsis spectabilis Diels

Synonyms
- Unonopsis velutina Maas

Species of flowering plant

Unonopsis spectabilis is a species of flowering plant in the custard apple family Annonaceae. It is a tree native to Bolivia, northern Brazil, Colombia, Ecuador, Peru, and southern Venezuela.
