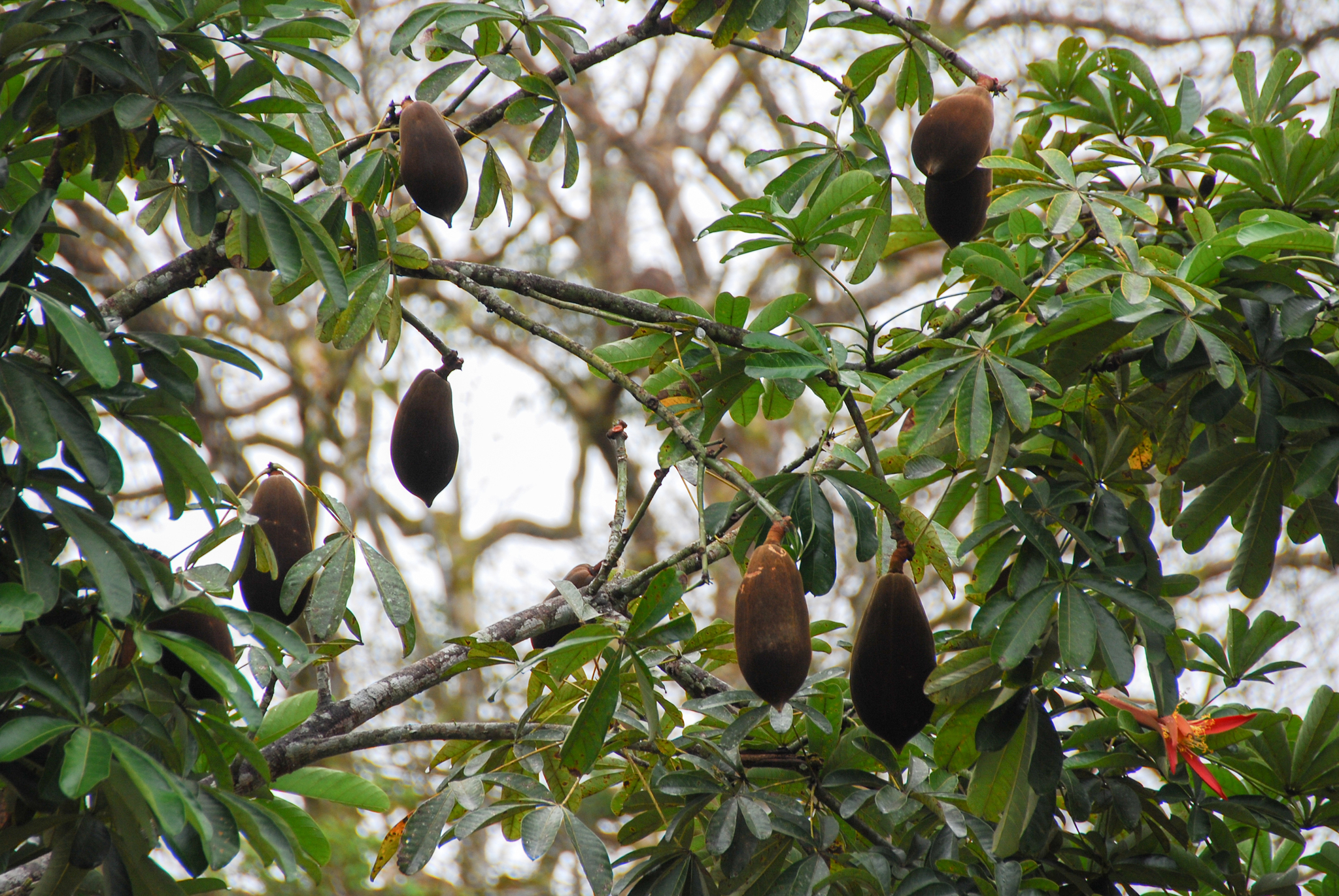

Scientific classification
- Kingdom: Plantae
- Clade: Embryophytes
- Clade: Tracheophytes
- Clade: Angiosperms
- Clade: Eudicots
- Clade: Rosids
- Order: Malvales
- Family: Malvaceae
- Genus: Pachira
- Species: P. insignis

Binomial name
- Pachira insignis (Sw.) Savigny

= Pachira insignis =

Species of plant

Pachira insignis is a tree belonging to the Baobab Subfamily (Bombacoideae) of the Mallow Family (Malvaceae) and native to the tropics of South America and nearby islands (e.g. Trinidad). Its English common names include "wild chestnut" and "wild breadnut". It is best known for its very large flowers; the widest (along with the closely related Pachira aquatica) borne by any tree; up to 70 cm (28 in) diameter. Each of the five yellow petals is up to 35 cm (14 in) in length by up to 5 cm (2.0 in) wide. The stamens are united in the lower third, divided into five subgroups in the middle third and become up to one thousand discrete stamens in the upper third.

Pachira insignis has been introduced in many tropical countries and is invasive in the Dominican Republic.

Pachira insignis is used for food and medicine. The seeds, young leaves, and flowers are eaten. It is also grown ornamentally and as a shade tree.
