= Unonopsis magnifolia =

Conservation status
- Vulnerable (IUCN 3.1)

Scientific classification
- Kingdom: Plantae
- Clade: Embryophytes
- Clade: Tracheophytes
- Clade: Spermatophytes
- Clade: Angiosperms
- Clade: Magnoliids
- Order: Magnoliales
- Family: Annonaceae
- Genus: Unonopsis
- Species: U. magnifolia

Binomial name
- Unonopsis magnifolia R.E.Fr.

Synonyms
- Uvaria magnifolia (R.E.Fr.) Ruiz & Pav.; Guatteria magnifica Ruiz & Pav. ex G.Don

Species of flowering plant

Unonopsis magnifolia is a species of plant in the Annonaceae family. It is endemic to Ecuador. Its natural habitat is subtropical or tropical moist lowland forests. It is threatened by habitat loss.
