= Unonopsis guatterioides =

Conservation status
- Least Concern (IUCN 3.1)

Scientific classification
- Kingdom: Plantae
- Clade: Embryophytes
- Clade: Tracheophytes
- Clade: Spermatophytes
- Clade: Angiosperms
- Clade: Magnoliids
- Order: Magnoliales
- Family: Annonaceae
- Genus: Unonopsis
- Species: U. guatterioides

Binomial name
- Unonopsis guatterioides (A.DC.) R.E.Fr. (1937)

Synonyms
- Synonymy: Annona peduncularis Steud.; Guatteria peduncularis (Steud.) Pulle; Trigynaea angustifolia Benth.; Trigynaea antillana Rolfe; Trigynaea boliviensis Britton; Trigynaea grandis Benth.; Trigynaea matthewsii Benth.; Unonopsis angustifolia (Benth.) R.E.Fr.; Unonopsis antillana (Rolfe) R.E.Fr.; Unonopsis boliviensis (Britton) R.E.Fr.; Unonopsis buchtienii R.E.Fr.; Unonopsis gracilis R.E.Fr.; Unonopsis grandis (Benth.) R.E.Fr.; Unonopsis guaraya Herzog; Unonopsis guatterioides A.DC. (1832) (basionym); Unonopsis guatterioides f. elongata R.E.Fr.; Unonopsis lindmanii R.E.Fr.; Unonopsis matthewsii (Benth.) R.E.Fr.; Unonopsis obovata R.E.Fr.; Unonopsis williamsii R.E.Fr.

Species of South American tree

Unonopsis guatterioides, also known as envieira, is a species of flowering plant in the genus Unonopsis. It is a tree native to tropical Southern America which produces white flowers, and is known to be used in both construction and tropical medicine.

== Description ==
Unonopsis guatterioides is an evergreen tree, typically growing from 4–7 m (13–23 ft) tall, with a trunk diameter of 8–18 cm (3.1–7.1 in). It has imparipinnate, alternate leaves with petioles that are 2–8 mm (0.079–0.315 in) long. It has entire, narrowly elliptic, camptodromous, petiolate leaves with an acuminate apex. The young twigs, petioles, and midribs are covered densely with white hairs. The inflorescences are 1-2 flowered, with pedicels ranging from 12–35 mm (0.47–1.38 in). The inflorescences produce globose flower buds, with free, ovate, triangular, 2–3 mm (0.079–0.118 in) long sepals, which are covered with brown hairs on the outer face. The petals are white or cream in colour, and are free, ovate, 2–7 mm (0.079–0.276 in) long and 4–6 mm (0.16–0.24 in) wide. The tree flowers in October, and the flowers have a strong scent in the mornings.

The berries start green and ripen through orange and red to become 'dark purplish', they are 10-18mm long, and rounded to minutely apiculate, with 5–12 mm (0.20–0.47 in) long stipes. The tree is monocarpic, and fruits between May and October.

== Etymology ==
The derivation of the Latin bimodal specific epithet Unonopsis guatterioides refers to the similarity of the plant to another Annonaceae genus, Guatteria.

== Habitat and ecology ==
U. guatterioides is well documented to grow along river sides in tropical lowland areas. It is described to grow in "non-inundated forest on sandy to clayey soil".

On the Global Biotic Interactions database, there are seven documented herbivores for U. guatterioides.

In a study of U. guatterioides floral biology, pollination visits by at least three groups were documented: male Elumaema bombiformis, Meliponidae bees, and Chrysomelidae coleopterans.

Aspergillus flavus (Aspergillus ear rot) is a documented pest of Unonopsis guatterioides.

== Range and habitat ==
U. guatterioides is native to a range of tropical South American countries. It is found in Brazil, Bolivia, Peru, Colombia, Venezuela, Guyana, Suriname, French Guyana, St Vincent and the Grenadines.

It grows in lowland areas from 0–1,000 m (0–3,281 ft) elevation, primarily alongside rivers.

The most frequent country for occurrences is Brazil, where 994/3832 of the occurrences were recorded.

== Taxonomy ==
The species was first described as Uvaria guatterioides by Alphonse Pyramus de Candolle in 1832. The holotype specimen for U. guatterioides currently resides at, Harvard University, Museum of Comparative Zoology. It was collected by Moriand S.N; no date; in French Guiana.

Work by Gottsberger et al. analysed floral scents, floral morphology, and pollinator visits for U. guatterioides populations between the Amazon and Minas Gerais in Brazil. Their findings included that the two populations were significantly different in many regards, that they could be described as two species, and that Unonopsis lindmanii R.E.Fr could be re-established as a valid taxon for the Minas Gerais Unonopsis plants.

U. guatterioides has one documented subspecies, Unonopsis guatterioides f. elongata. This subspecies was described by Robert Elias Fries in 1937 in Acta Horti Berg. (12: 242. 1937) as a subspecies which occurs in Suriname. However, this subspecies epithet seems to not be in wide use, with no major publications referring to the subspecies.

The species U. guatterioides currently has one accepted homotypic synonym, and nineteen heterotypic synonyms.

== Conservation ==
The IUCN Red List assessed U. guatterioides as Least Concern in 2018.

== Uses ==
There are a number of documented uses for U. guatterioides. An extract made from the bark, and the bark itself are known to be used to treat snakebite and fevers respectively.

One source cites that the trunk is used for construction, however, other sources cite that the wood is of low quality, not used for construction or for fuel. The wood is light, and can be used for the construction of light boxes.

In addition to use in medicine, the bark is documented to be used as strapping for carrying objects, or to make rudimentary fibre.

== Research ==
Chemical analysis has mapped the phytochemistry and biological activities of U. guatterioides, showing that it contains essential oils with potential for pharmaceutical uses.

Furthermore, research from 2014 showed that U. guatterioides extract could have potential antibacterial properties against carcinogenically implicated bacteria.

The bark of U. guatterioides is known to contain steroid molecules.

Finally, research from 1999 showed that U. guatterioides contains certain alkaloids which could have promise as potential antiprotozoal properties.

There are four nucleotide sequences, and associated four protein, sequences available on NCBI. These are sequences of: maturase enzyme gene matK; 2 sequences of the rubisco large subunit gene, rbcL; and a sequence of the photosystem II gene, psbA.
