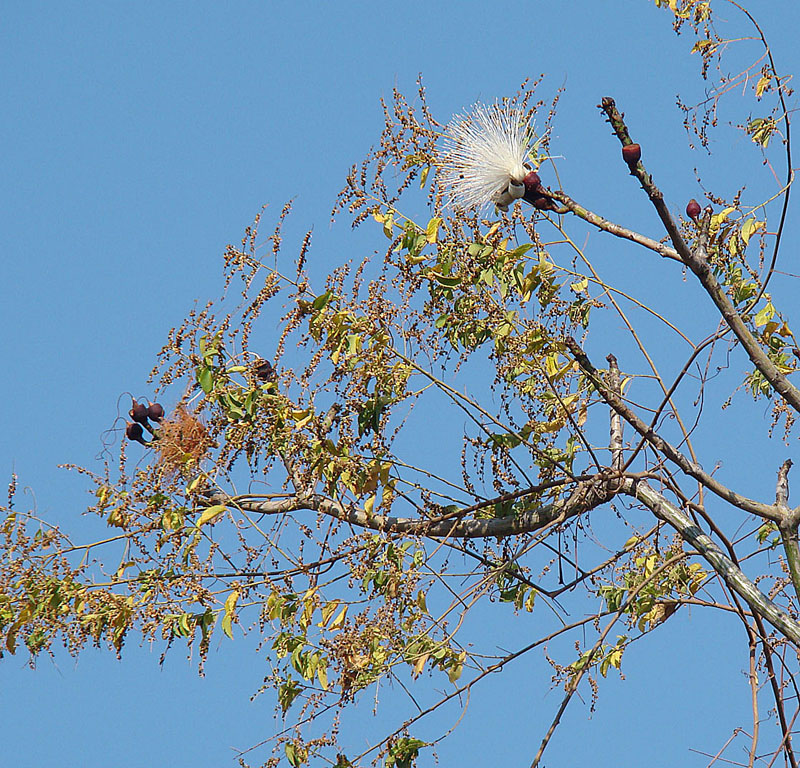

Scientific classification
- Kingdom: Plantae
- Clade: Tracheophytes
- Clade: Angiosperms
- Clade: Eudicots
- Clade: Rosids
- Order: Malvales
- Family: Malvaceae
- Genus: Pachira
- Species: P. sessilis

Binomial name
- Pachira sessilis Benth.

= Pachira sessilis =

Species of plant

Pachira sessilis is a neotropical tree in the subfamily Bombacoideae of the family Malvaceae and is native to Central America. Its common name is yuco de monte. The leaves are palmately divided with 5 to 7 leaflets, but differ from other Pachira species in having indented leaf tips. The large flowers are similar in form to those of Pachira aquatica but smaller and dark red.
