= Tacarcuna tapaculo =

Conservation status
- Near Threatened (IUCN 3.1)

Scientific classification
- Kingdom: Animalia
- Phylum: Chordata
- Class: Aves
- Order: Passeriformes
- Family: Rhinocryptidae
- Genus: Scytalopus
- Species: S. panamensis

Binomial name
- Scytalopus panamensis Chapman, 1915

Species of bird

The Tacarcuna tapaculo (Scytalopus panamensis) is a species of bird in the family Rhinocryptidae. It is found in Panama and Colombia.

This species is at risk of endangerment. One reason being that the protocols to protect these animals does not protect them entirely. The issue of endangerment is mostly due to the fact that the sole protected area only covers forests below 600m and the bird is above on elevation rate.

== Taxonomy and systematics ==
The Tacarcuna tapaculo was formerly called the "pale-throated tapaculo", and what was later split as Nariño tapaculo (Scytalopus vicinior) was included as a subspecies.

== Description ==
The Tacarcuna tapaculo is 11 cm (4.3 in) long. The male's upperparts are dark gray and the lower back and rump are reddish. The throat and breast are lighter gray and the flanks and crissum (the area around the cloaca) are tawny with black bars. It has a prominent whitish supercilium. The female is similar but has browner upper parts.

== Distribution and habitat ==
The Tacarcuna tapaculo is found only in Cerro Tacarcuna, which straddles the Panama-Colombia border, and Cerro Mali, slightly further south in Panama. It inhabits the undergrowth of humid montane forest and its edges at elevations from 1,050 to 1,500 m (3,440 to 4,920 ft).

== Behavior ==
The Tacarcuna tapaculo forages on the ground and low in vegetation, usually in pairs. Its diet has not been recorded. Nothing is known about its breeding phenology.

== Status ==
The IUCN has assessed the Tacarcuna tapaculo as Near Threatened. Though it is reasonably common in its range, its range is small, approximately 490 km^{2} (189 mi^{2}). The population is estimated at between 6000 and 15,000 individuals and is believed to be stable. Though the species is partially protected in national parks in both countries it faces threats from mining and agricultural encroachment.
