= Leptodactylus wagneri =

Conservation status
- Least Concern (IUCN 3.1)

Scientific classification
- Kingdom: Animalia
- Phylum: Chordata
- Class: Amphibia
- Order: Anura
- Family: Leptodactylidae
- Genus: Leptodactylus
- Species: L. wagneri

Binomial name
- Leptodactylus wagneri (Peters, 1862)

Synonyms
- Plectromantis wagneri Peters, 1862

Species of frog

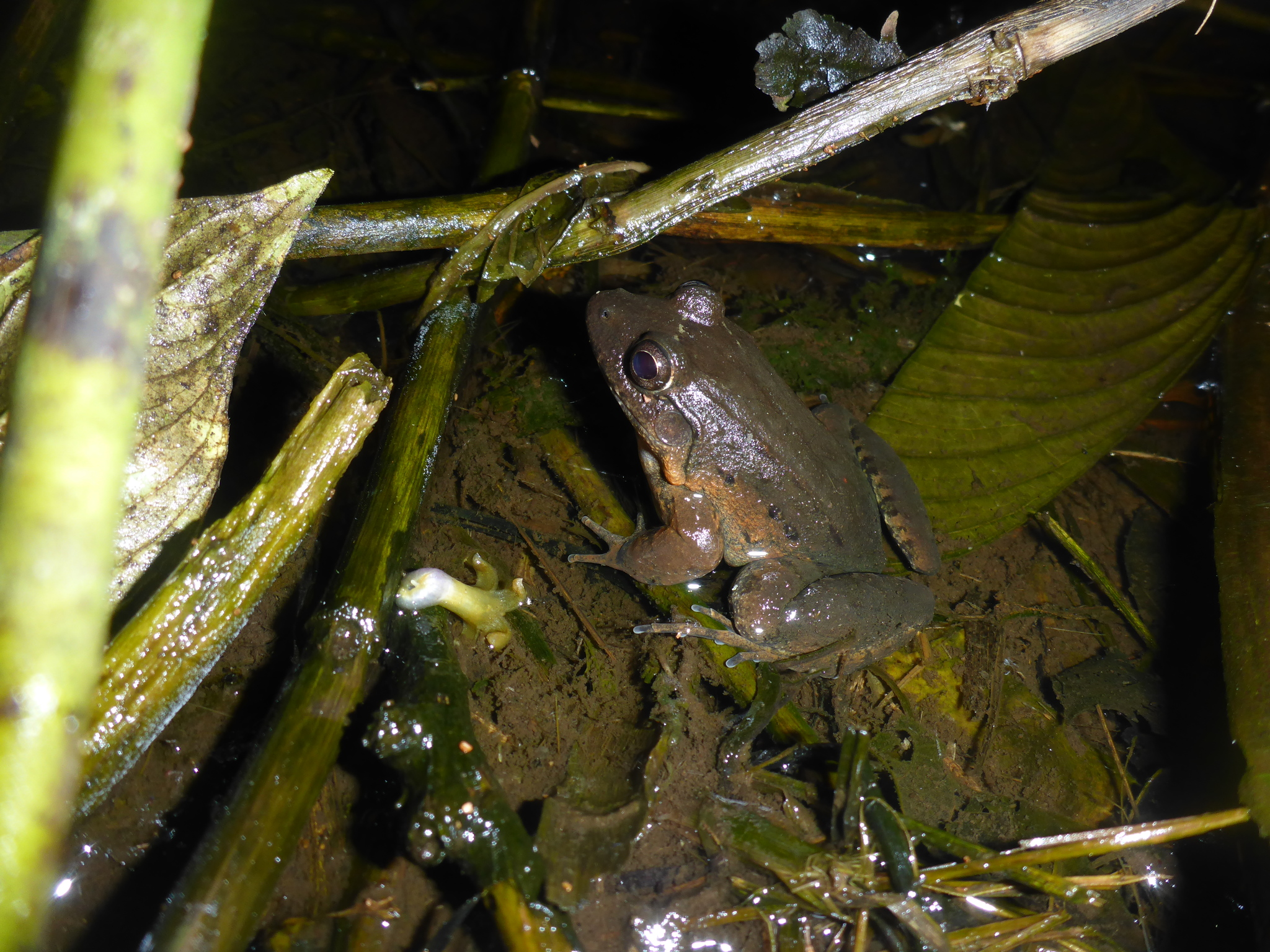
Leptodactylus wagerni

Leptodactylus wagneri (common name: Wagner's white-lipped frog) is a species of frog in the family Leptodactylidae. It is found in northern South America (Brazil, Colombia, Ecuador, and Peru).

== Description ==
Male Leptodactylus wagneri grow to a snout–vent length of 39–61 mm (1.5–2.4 in) and females to 52–82 mm (2.0–3.2 in).

== Etymology ==
Scientists named the frog wagneri for the German scientist and collector Dr. Moritz Wagner.

== Home ==
This frog lives in many kinds of places, for example marshes, swamps, primary and secondary forest, streams, lakes, and people's gardens. Scientists saw the frog between 200 and 1800 meters above sea level. Scientists saw the frog in many protected places.

== Reproduction ==
The female frog lays eggs in a foam nest. The tadpoles develop in water.

== Threats ==
The IUCN classifies this frog as least concern of extinction. Human beings changed the places where the frog lives, but it is good at living in places that human beings have changed, for example people's gardens.
