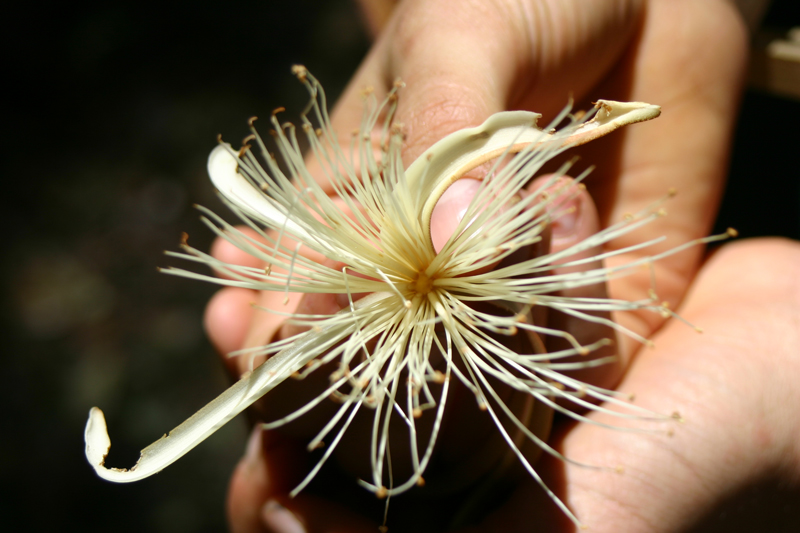
- Flower showing abundance of stamens

Conservation status
- Vulnerable (IUCN 2.3)

Scientific classification
- Kingdom: Plantae
- Clade: Embryophytes
- Clade: Tracheophytes
- Clade: Spermatophytes
- Clade: Angiosperms
- Clade: Eudicots
- Clade: Rosids
- Order: Malvales
- Family: Malvaceae
- Genus: Pachira
- Species: P. quinata

Binomial name
- Pachira quinata (Jacq.) W.S.Alverson

Synonyms
- Bombacopsis quinata (Jacq.) Dugand; Bombax quinatum Jacq.

= Pachira quinata =

Species of tree

Pachira quinata, commonly known as pochote, is a species of flowering tree in the mallow family, Malvaceae. It inhabits dry forests in Costa Rica, Nicaragua, Honduras Panama, Venezuela, and Colombia. Pochotes bear large, stubby thorns on their trunk and branches and are often planted as living fenceposts with barbed wire strung between them. These thorns are also often used to make small house-like sculptures that are believed to bring protection to someone's house since the pochote is believed to be sacred.

The tree is largely plantation grown in Costa Rica for its lumber, which is an ideal, remarkably stable hardwood similar in working properties to Cedrela odorata (Spanish cedar). It is one of the most affordable woods in Costa Rica, and is used in furniture, guitar marking, and other fine woodcrafts.
