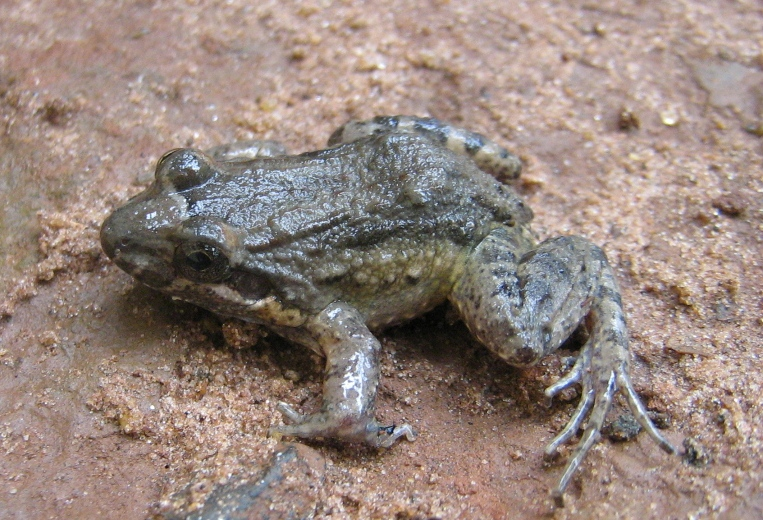

Conservation status
- Least Concern (IUCN 3.1)

Scientific classification
- Kingdom: Animalia
- Phylum: Chordata
- Class: Amphibia
- Order: Anura
- Family: Leptodactylidae
- Genus: Leptodactylus
- Species: L. podicipinus

Binomial name
- Leptodactylus podicipinus (Cope, 1862)

Synonyms
- Cystignathus podicipinus Cope, 1862; Leptodactylus nattereri Lutz, 1926

= Leptodactylus podicipinus =

Species of amphibian

Leptodactylus podicipinus, sometimes known as the pointedbelly frog, is a species of frog in the family Leptodactylidae. It is found in northern Argentina, Paraguay, Uruguay, Bolivia, and Brazil.

Leptodactylus podicipinus live in grasslands and open habitats, often near ponds and flooded areas. They are common in suitable habitats. Eggs are laid in foam nests at the edges of permanent or temporary ponds and flooded areas.

Male Leptodactylus podicipinus grow to a snout–vent length of 24 and 43 mm (0.94 and 1.69 in) and females to 30 and 54 mm (1.2 and 2.1 in).

== Description ==
Leptodactylus podicipinus is a medium-sized member of its genus, with females having a snout-to-vent length between 30 and 54 mm (1.2 and 2.1 in) and males between 24 and 43 mm (0.94 and 1.69 in). The dorsolateral folds are short and poorly developed, and there are yellowish glandular parches on the flanks and in the groin. The dorsal surface is brown and the underparts are dark grey, usually spotted or mottled with white; this patterning merges into mottling on the back of the thigh. The tips of the toes are either straight or are slightly bulbous. The tadpoles grow to a total length of about 28 mm (1.1 in) and are brown, sometimes with white speckles on the tail.

== Distribution and habitat ==
Leptodactylus podicipinus is found in the northern half of South America. Its range extends from central and western Brazil southward to northern and eastern Bolivia, Paraguay, northeastern Argentina and northern Uruguay. It typically inhabits open areas near rivers which experience seasonal flooding, moist grassland and the vicinity of ponds. It occurs at altitudes of up to 1,000 m (3,300 ft).

== Ecology ==
Like other members of the genus, Leptodactylus podicipinus has a strong skull and legs adapted for digging; the male uses both its snout and legs when digging. Another characteristic it shares is the creation by the male of a foam nest for the eggs. Among populations in the Pantanal of Brazil, males have been observed finding or digging depressions in the ground close to the edge of ponds, rather than in the larger bodies of water, the foam nests being then made in these small, water-filed basins. Other populations elsewhere in its range have not been observed engaging in this behaviour, which is an intermediate stage between the subterranean nests of the Leptodactylus fuscus group of species, and the floating nests of other less-derived species.

== Status ==
In most of its wide range, Leptodactylus podicipinus is a common frog. It does not appear to have any specific threats and is adaptable, living in areas disturbed by man including urban areas of northern Argentina. It also occurs in a number of preserved areas. For all these reasons, the International Union for Conservation of Nature has assessed its conservation status as being of "least concern".
