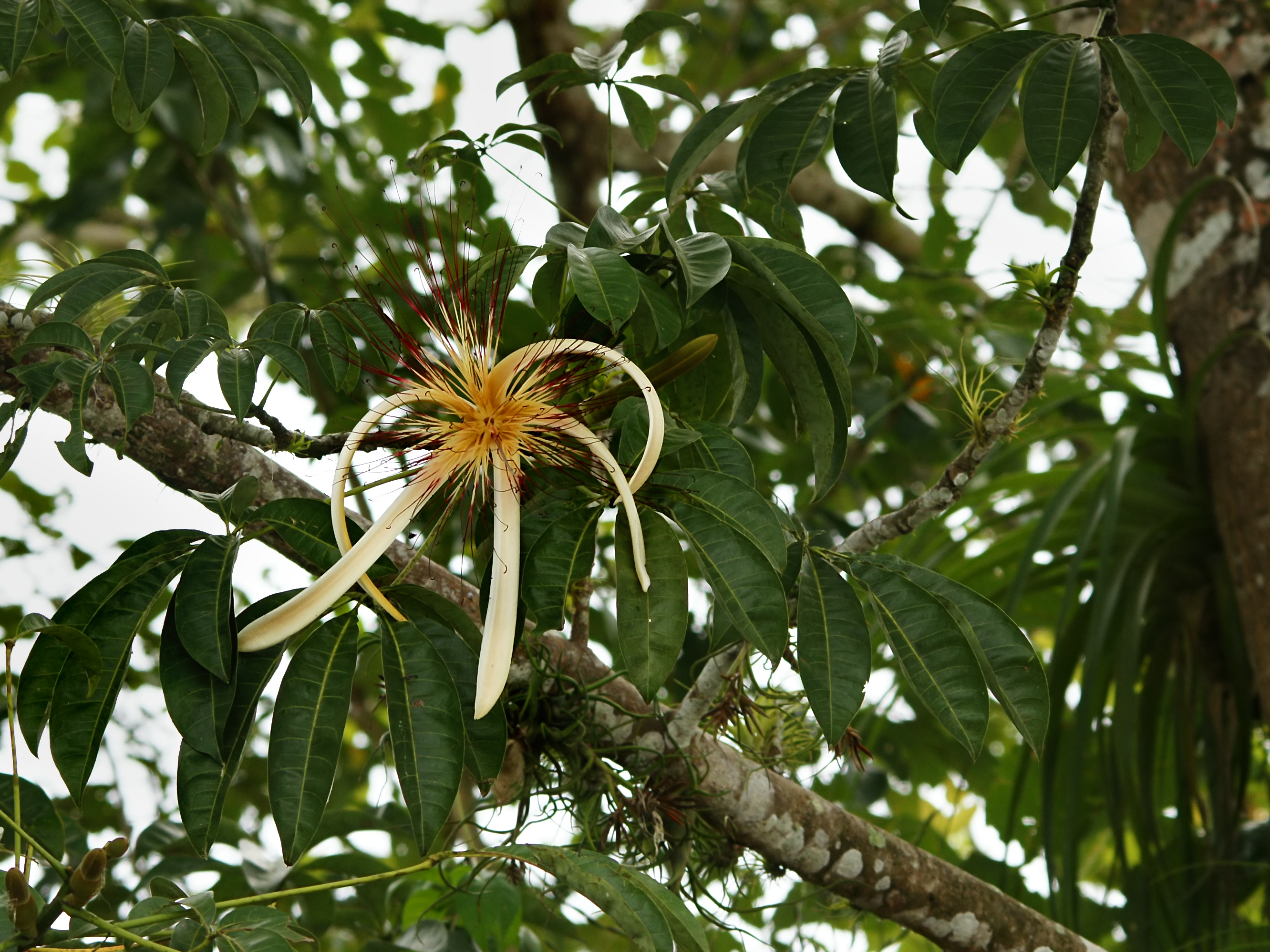
- Pachira aquatica

Scientific classification
- Kingdom: Plantae
- Clade: Tracheophytes
- Clade: Angiosperms
- Clade: Eudicots
- Clade: Rosids
- Order: Malvales
- Family: Malvaceae
- Subfamily: Bombacoideae
- Genus: Pachira; Aubl.

Species
- See text

Synonyms
- Bombacopsis Pittier; Carolinea L.f.; Raussinia Neck.; Rhodognaphalopsis A.Robyns; Sophia L.

= Pachira =

Genus of trees

Pachira is a genus of tropical trees distributed in Central and South America and the Caribbean, ranging from Mexico to Bolivia and southern Brazil. They are classified in the subfamily Bombacoideae of the family Malvaceae. Previously the genus was assigned to Bombacaceae. Prior to that the genus was found in the (now obsolete) Sterculiaceae.

54 species are currently accepted. They form small or large trees with digitate leaves, and the fruit an oval woody one-celled capsule opening by a number of divisions and containing many seeds.

== History ==
Although first named Pachira by Jean Baptiste Aublet in 1775. The genus name is derived from a language spoken in Guyana. Carl Linnaeus the Younger unaware of this separately is said to have called the genus Carolinea after Princess (or Marchioness) "Sophia Caroline of Baden" in 1782. The principle of precedence gives the authority to Pachira.

The Margrave of Baden, Karl Wilhelm (1709 – 1738) founded the Karlsruhe Palace (Karlsruher Schloß) in 1715. He had a considerable interest in botany, particularly the exotic, and had large numbers of trees imported for the Palace Gardens (Schloßgarten). He was succeeded by his Grandson, Karl Friedrich (1738 - 1811) who married Princess Karoline Luise von Hessen-Darmstadt (1723 - 1783) in 1751. Karoline Luise was a noted botanist. She corresponded with Carl von Linné (Linnaeus), cultivated numerous plants in the palace gardens, had engravings of them made for a book and had them all classified according to Linnaeus' system. Linnaeus' son, Carl Linnaeus the younger, recognised her contributions by naming one of the trees, Pachira aquatica (German: Glückskastanie) Carolinea princeps after her.

== Commercial use ==
Timber, cordage and seeds for stuffing pillows and cushions.

== Species ==
54 species are accepted.

- Pachira amazonica (A.Robyns) W.S.Alverson
- Pachira aquatica Aubl. (syn. P. macrocarpa)
- Pachira aracamuniana (Steyerm.) W.S.Alverson
- Pachira brevipes (A.Robyns) W.S.Alverson
- Pachira calophylla (K.Schum.) Fern.Alonso
- Pachira cearensis (Ducke) Carv.-Sobr. & Dorr
- Pachira condorensis Fern.Alonso & J.E.Guevara
- Pachira coriacea (Mart.) W.S.Alverson
- Pachira cowanii (A.Robyns) W.S.Alverson
- Pachira cubensis (A.Robyns) Fern.Alonso
- Pachira deflexifolia V.N.Yoshik. & M.C.Duarte
- Pachira dolichocalyx A.Robyns
- Pachira duckei (A.Robyns) Fern.Alonso
- Pachira dugandeana (A.Robyns) Fern.Alonso
- Pachira emarginata A. Rich.
- Pachira endecaphylla (Vell.) Carv.-Sobr.
- Pachira faroensis (Ducke) W.S.Alverson
- Pachira flaviflora (Pulle) Fern.Alonso
- Pachira fuscolepidota (Steyerm.) W.S.Alverson
- Pachira glabra Pasq.
- Pachira gracilis (A.Robyns) W.S.Alverson
- Pachira humilis Otto & A.Dietr.
- Pachira inaequalivalvis V.N.Yoshik. & M.C.Duarte
- Pachira insignis (Sw.) Savigny
- Pachira liesneri (Steyerm.) W.S.Alverson
- Pachira macrocalyx (Ducke) Fern.Alonso
- Pachira manausensis (A.Robyns) V.N.Yoshik. & C.D.M.Ferreira
- Pachira mawarinumae (Steyerm.) W.S.Alverson
- Pachira minor (Sims) Otto & A.Dietr.
- Pachira morae Fern.Alonso
- Pachira moreirae Carv.-Sobr. & W.S.Alverson
- Pachira mutisiana Fern.Alonso
- Pachira nervosa (Uittien) Fern.Alonso
- Pachira nitida Kunth
- Pachira nukakica Fern.Alonso
- Pachira obovata (A.Robyns) W.S.Alverson
- Pachira orinocensis (A.Robyns) W.S.Alverson
- Pachira paraensis (Ducke) W.S.Alverson
- Pachira patinoi (Dugand & A.Robyns) Fern.Alonso
- Pachira pseudofaroensis (A.Robyns) W.S.Alverson
- Pachira pulchra Planch. & Linden
- Pachira punga-schunkei Fern.Alonso
- Pachira quinata (Jacq.) W.S.Alverson
- Pachira retusa (Mart.) Fern.Alonso
- Pachira robynsii (Steyerm. & W.D.Stevens) W.S.Alverson
- Pachira rupicola (A.Robyns) W.S.Alverson
- Pachira rurrenabaqueana (Rusby) Fern.Alonso
- Pachira sessilis Benth.
- Pachira sordida (R.E.Schult.) W.S.Alverson
- Pachira speciosa Triana & Planch.
- Pachira subandina (Dugand) Fern.Alonso
- Pachira tepuiensis (Steyerm.) W.S.Alverson
- Pachira tocantina (Ducke) Fern.Alonso
- Pachira trinitensis Urb.
- Pachira yapacanae Steyerm. ex W.S.Alverson

=== Formerly placed here ===
- Pseudobombax grandiflorum (Cav.) A.Robyns (as P. cyathophora Casar.)
