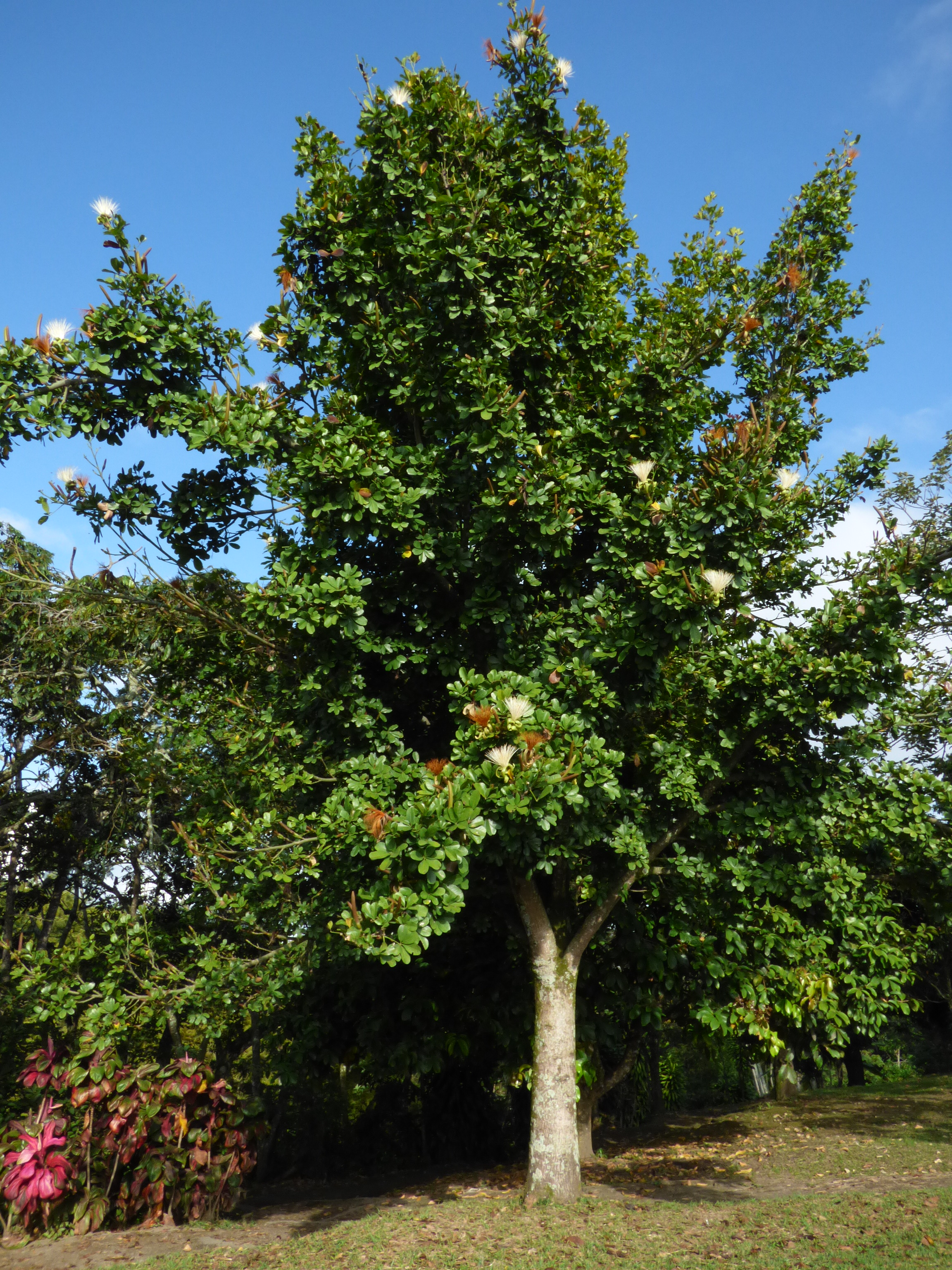

Scientific classification
- Kingdom: Plantae
- Clade: Tracheophytes
- Clade: Angiosperms
- Clade: Eudicots
- Clade: Rosids
- Order: Malvales
- Family: Malvaceae
- Genus: Pachira
- Species: P. glabra

Binomial name
- Pachira glabra Pasq.

Synonyms
- Bombacopsis glabra (Pasq.) Robyns; Bombax glabrum (Pasq.) A.Robyns

= Pachira glabra =

Species of plant

Pachira glabra (syn. Bombacopsis glabra) is a tropical wetland tree in the mallow family, Malvaceae, native to eastern Brazil, where it grows along waterways. It is generally known by the nonscientific names Guinea peanut, French peanut, Saba nut, money tree, and lucky tree. It shares many of these common names with the similar P. aquatica.

== Description ==
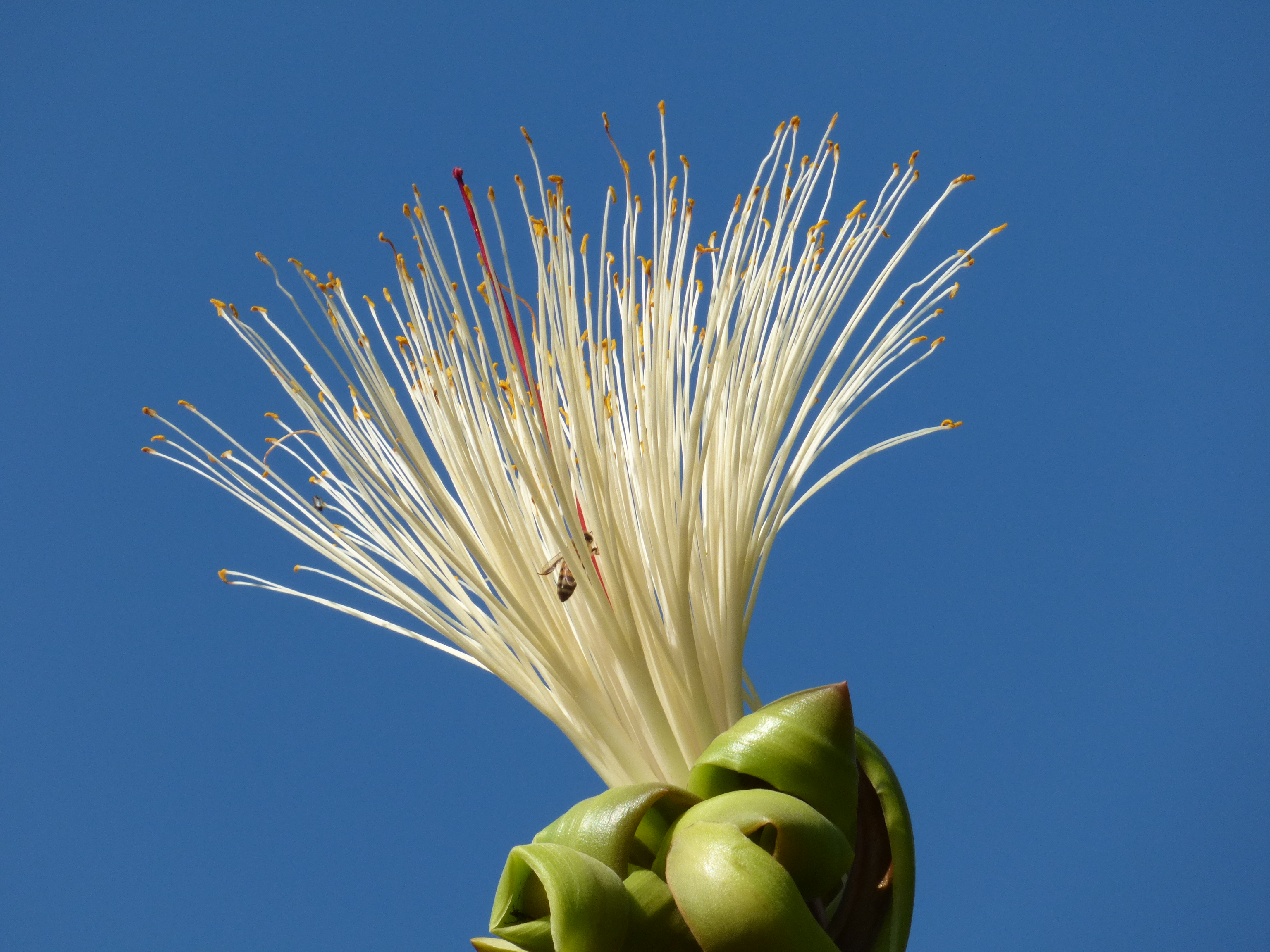
Flower

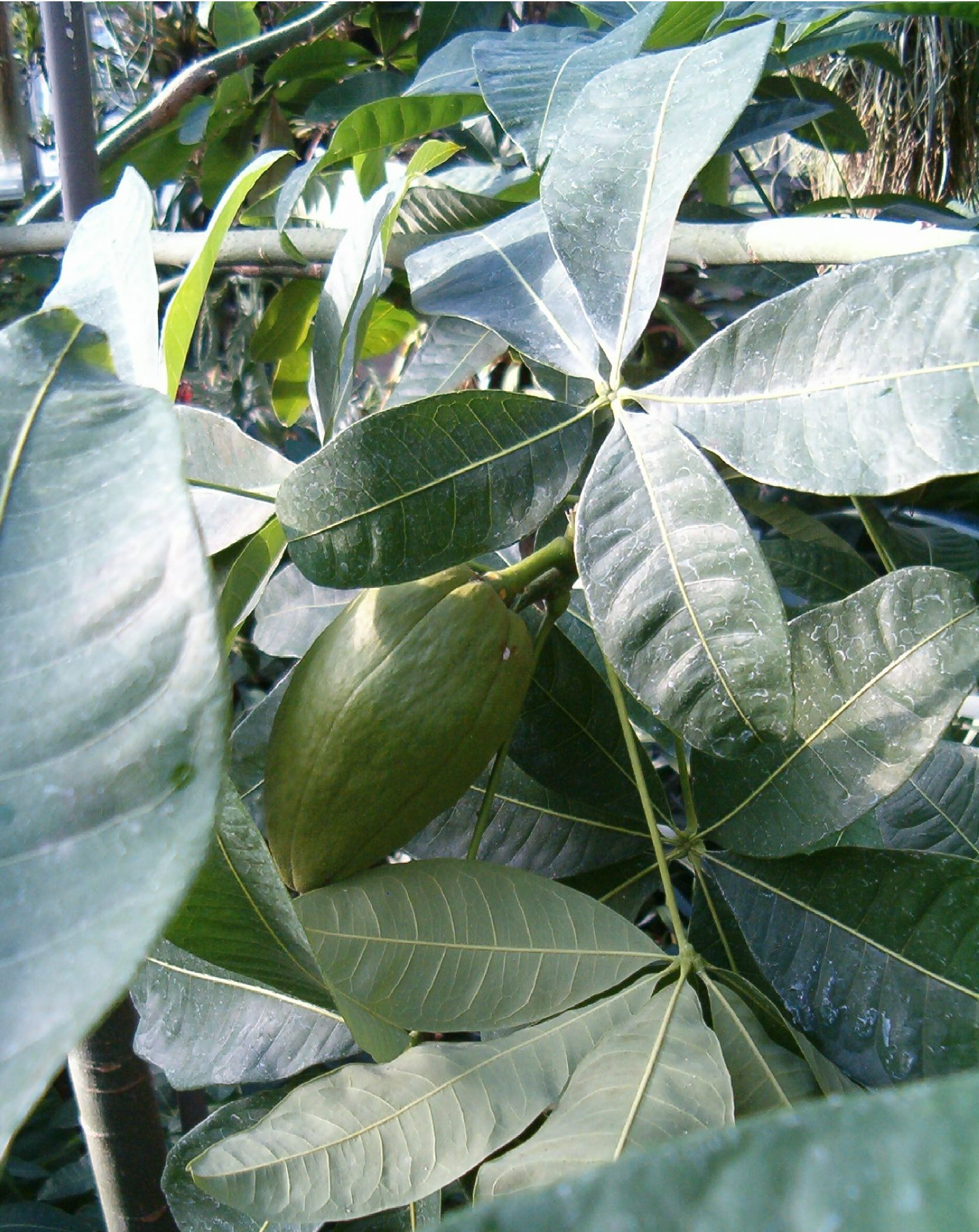
Foliage

Pachira glabra reaches heights of 9–18 meters (30–60 ft), and its leaves are compound with a fan of 5 to 9 leaflets. It has smooth greenish-gray bark and the trunks are often swollen at the base, even at a young age. Its large, white, fragrant flowers bloom on a long, terminal peduncle, opening at night and dropping by the middle of the following day. Its 10–20-centimeter-long (4–8 in) smooth green fruit split open naturally to reveal 10 to 25 irregularly rounded brown seeds that are roughly 2.5 cm (1 in) in diameter.

The Pachira glabra plant has a five-lobed shape of its leaves. Because of this reason, in Chinese Feng Shui, Pachira glabra is thought to represent the 5 elements of feng shui: Wood, fire, earth, water and metal, giving it a unique name called money tree as people believe it can create a harmonious balance of positive energy.

=== Similar species ===
Pachira aquatica (the Malabar chestnut) is quite similar looking, has similar culinary and ornamental uses, and goes by many of the same common names. P. aquatica has woody gray bark, while P. glabras's is a smoother greenish-gray, and P. aquatica will only develop a swollen trunk with age. Likewise, the flowers of P. aquatica feature red-tipped petals and red anthers, whereas the flowers of P. glabra are all white. In addition, the P. aquatica blooms last marginally longer than those of P. glabra. P. glabra capsules (fruits) are green rather than brown like those of P. aquatica. Seed yields of P. glabra are also lower than those of P. aquatica.

== Distribution and habitat ==
The species is native to eastern Brazil, where it grows along rivers and other waterways.

The tree is highly adaptable to various soils and flourishes in full sun or partial shade. The tree is both drought and flood resistant.

== Uses ==
=== Culinary ===
P. glabra is grown in West and Central Africa as a foodcrop. The seeds are rich in oil and contain 16% protein and 40–50% fat. The seeds taste similar to peanuts and are typically boiled or roasted, with the roasted seeds sometimes ground to make a hot drink. The young leaves and flowers are also eaten.

=== Ornamental ===
Young P. glabra trees can easily be grown in flowerpots and survive a range of conditions as long as they remain above freezing temperatures. They are marketed commercially as ornamentals with several small trees in a single flowerpot, their trunks braided; specimens are similar in appearance to P. aquatica and the small ornamentals sold as P. aquatica are almost all actually P. glabra. (Note: Even in Taiwan, where commercial ornamental cultivation of the "Malabar chestnut" (馬拉巴栗) began, the plants are usually P. glabra rather than P. aquatica.)
