= Unonopsis floribunda =

Scientific classification
- Kingdom: Plantae
- Clade: Tracheophytes
- Clade: Angiosperms
- Clade: Magnoliids
- Order: Magnoliales
- Family: Annonaceae
- Genus: Unonopsis
- Species: U. floribunda

Binomial name
- Unonopsis floribunda Diels

Species of tree

Unonopsis floribunda is a tree with dark bark that produces black fruit and red latex. It was first described by Ludwig Diels. It has been documented from Bolivia, Brazil, Colombia, Ecuador, Panama, and Peru.
