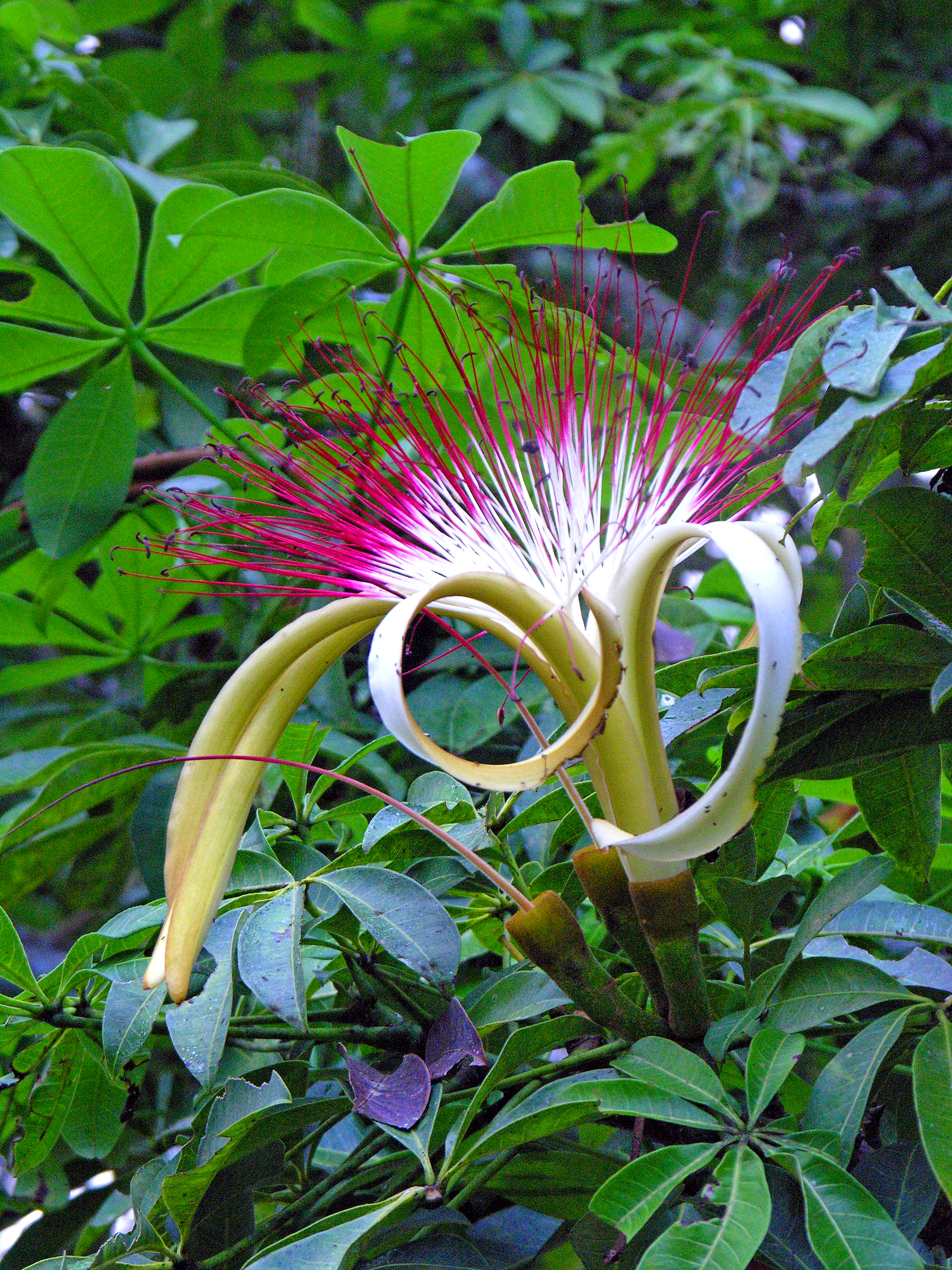
- Foliage and flower, Guatemala

Conservation status
- Least Concern (IUCN 3.1)

Scientific classification
- Kingdom: Plantae
- Clade: Tracheophytes
- Clade: Angiosperms
- Clade: Eudicots
- Clade: Rosids
- Order: Malvales
- Family: Malvaceae
- Genus: Pachira
- Species: P. aquatica

Binomial name
- Pachira aquatica Aubl.

Synonyms
- Carolinea macrocarpa Bombax macrocarpum Pachira macrocarpa

= Pachira aquatica =

Species of tree

Pachira aquatica is a species of tropical wetland tree in the mallow family Malvaceae, native to Central and South America where it grows in swamps. It is known by its common names Malabar chestnut, French peanut, Guiana chestnut, provision tree, Saba nut, Monguba (Brazil), Pumpo (Guatemala) and Jelinjoche (Costa Rica) and is commercially sold under the names money tree and money plant. This tree is sometimes sold with a braided trunk and is commonly grown as a houseplant, although more commonly what is sold as a "Pachira aquatica" houseplant is in fact a similar species, Pachira glabra.

== Description ==
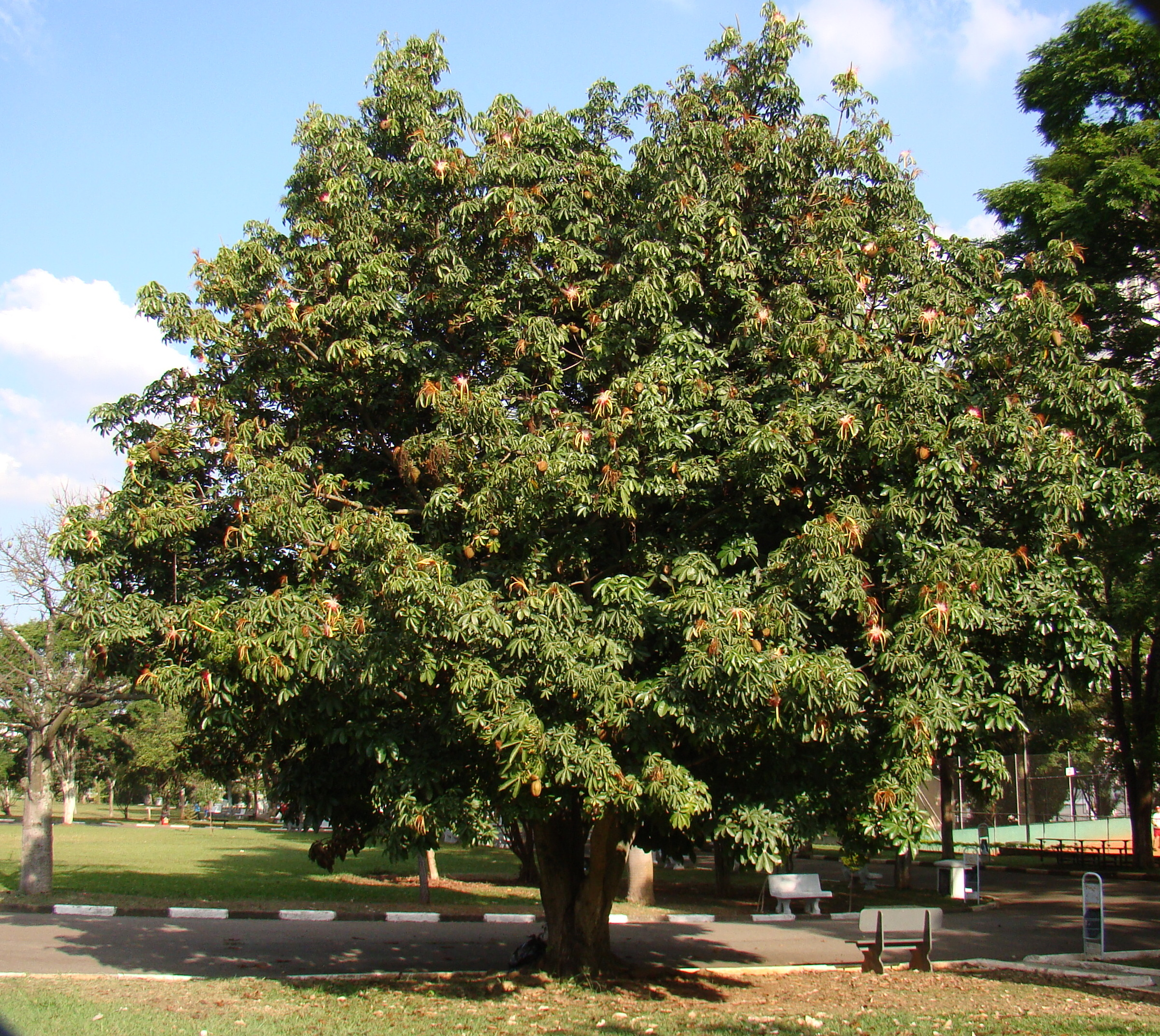
Cultivated tree

Pachira aquatica can grow up to 23 m (75 ft) tall with a diameter of 70 cm (28 in) at breast height. It has shiny green palmate leaves with lanceolate leaflets up to 30 cm (12 in) in length, and smooth green bark. This species forms a slightly thickened root with smaller roots, which also serves as a water reservoir. The relatively smooth bark is brown through gray and slightly cracked; young branches are green. Outdoors, P. aquatica produces a broad crown. The transitional and long-stalked, composite hand-shaped, slightly leathery leaves are arranged at the branch ends. The petiole is up to 24 cm (9.4 in) long. The leaves are bright green and shiny and consist of up to nine leaflets (fingers). The mostly glabrous, short-stalked leaflets are up through 28 cm long and rounded through round pointed, spiked, or pointed. They are lanceolate or obovate, with a light middle veins. There are sloping stipules present. The leaves and flowers are also often eaten.

Its showy flowers, said to have the fragrance of lilacs, have long, narrow petals up to 32 cm (13 in) long, that open like a banana peel to reveal hairlike yellowish orange stamens. The greenish-yellow or cream-colored, hermaphroditic and very large, short and thick-stalked flowers with double perianth resemble shaving brushes through the long stamens. The terminal, single, twofold, or threefold flowers suggest that bats are the pollinators. The outside fine-haired, green-brown and overgrown calyx is cup-shaped and about 2 cm long. The narrow, elongated petals can reach up to 30 cm long. Flowers with petals up to 34 cm (13 in) long and 5.5 cm (2.2 in) wide have been reported on Barro Colorado Island. The approximately 180–250 stamens, deep pink at the top and yellow at the base, with elongated anthers are overgrown and tufted above. The five-chambered ovaries uppermost with a long stylus with divided, short lobed scar. The capsules are large, brown, woody, up to 20–30 cm long, rough, and egg-shaped, with a diameter of about 10–15 cm, weigh about 1–1.5 kg, and contain 10–25 nuts.

== Etymology ==
The genus name is derived from a language spoken in Guyana.

The species name is Latin for "aquatic". It is classified in the subfamily Bombacoideae of the family Malvaceae. Previously it was assigned to Bombacaceae.

The name "money tree" is believed to refer to a story of its origin, in which a poor man prayed for money, found this "odd" plant, took it home as an omen, and made money selling plants grown from its seeds.

== Cultivation ==
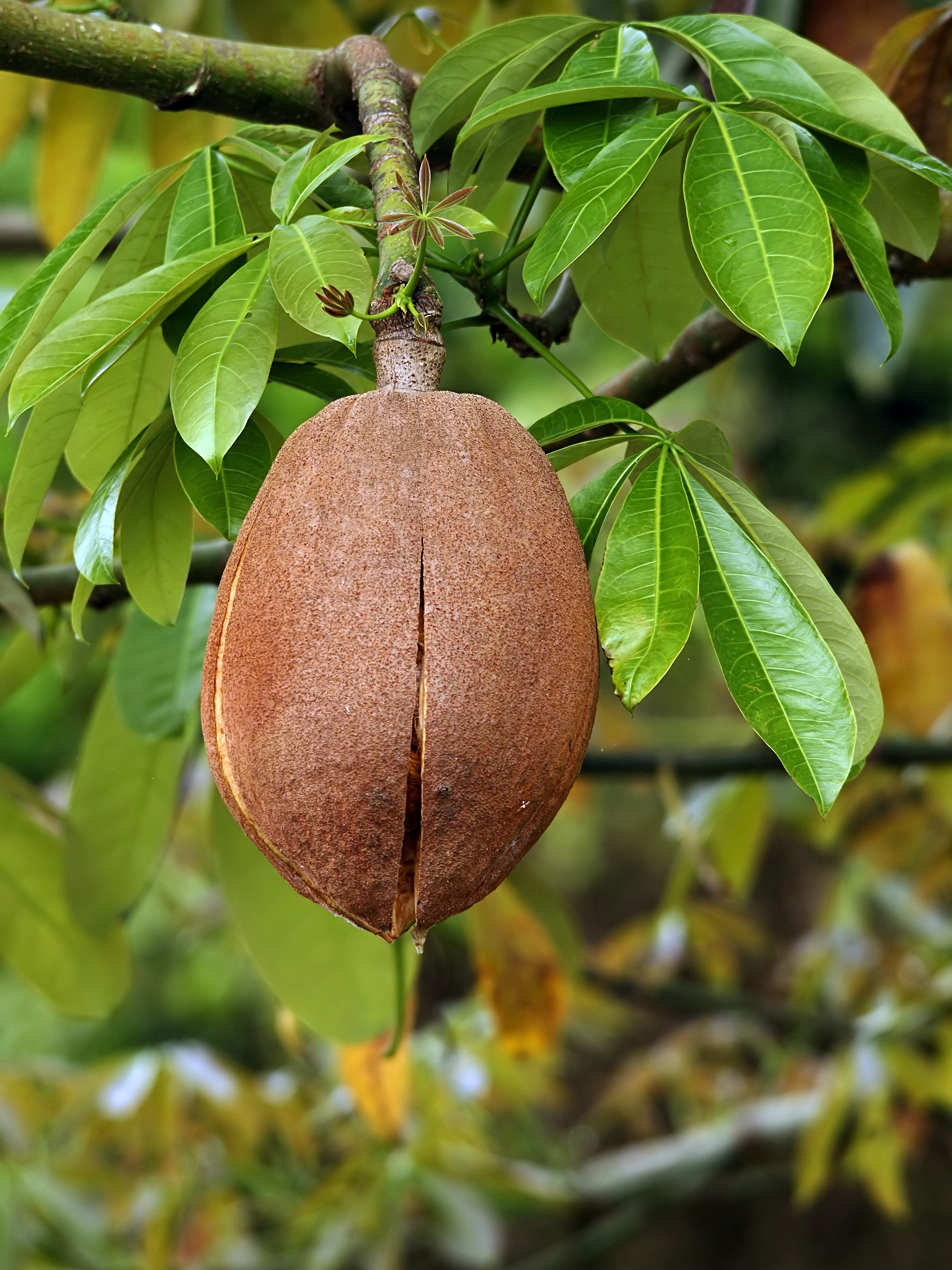
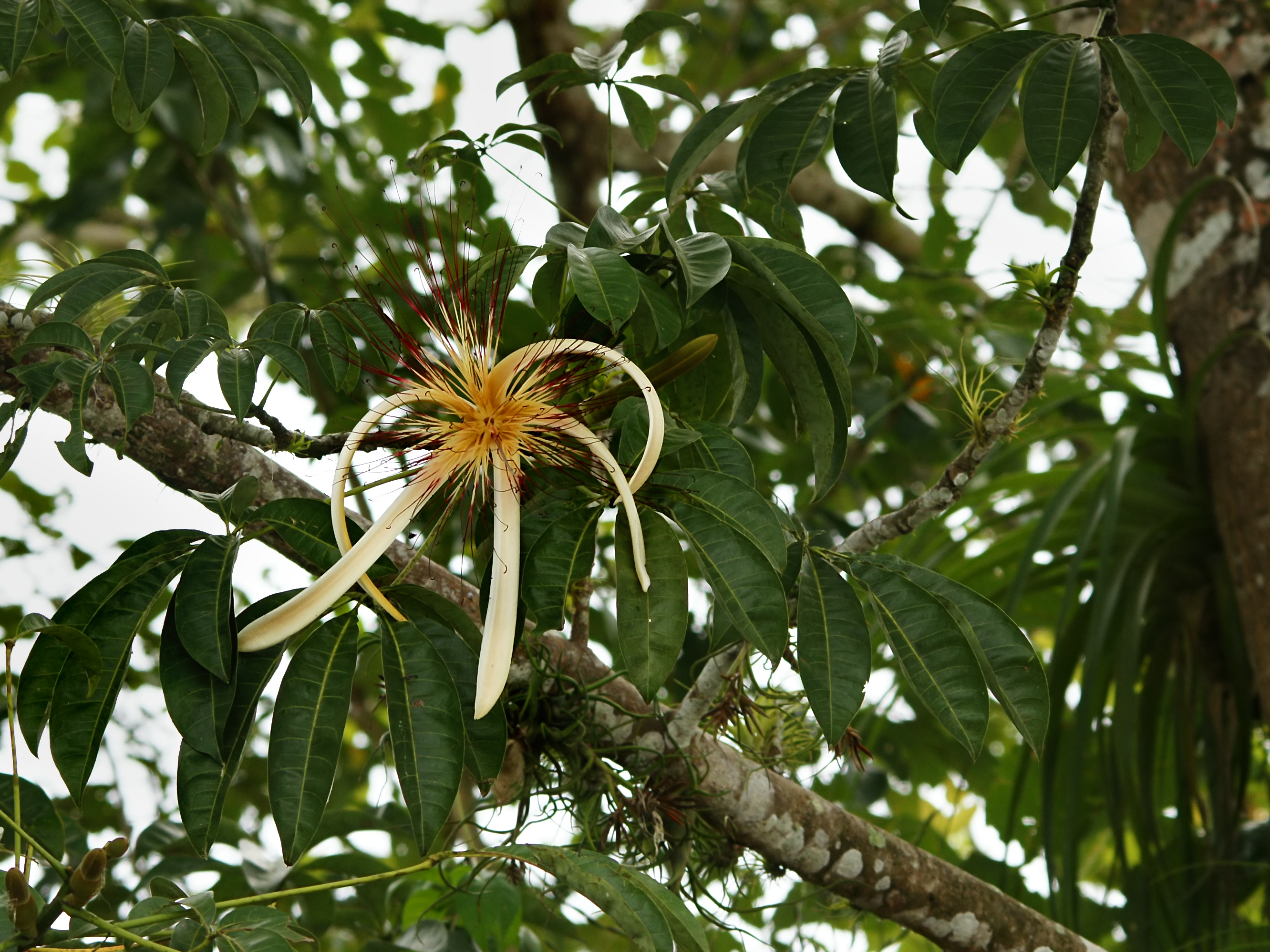
P. aquatica fruit and flower

Most trees cultivated as ornamental houseplants that are identified as Pachira aquatica are actually the related Pachira glabra. While both P. aquatica and P. glabra have such ornamental uses, the often-braided houseplant known as a "money tree" originally exported from Taiwan is P. glabra. The association with P. aquatica derives from an early misidentification in Taiwan. As plant author Wang Jui-min explains that "for a long time, [this plant] was mistakenly believed to be the Pachira aquatica widely distributed in Central and South America...Later it was discovered that the filaments of the Malabar chestnut are red and the fruit is covered with reddish-brown hairs, which is significantly different from the smooth chestnut commonly cultivated in Taiwan". He notes that "all species cultivated in Taiwan are Pachira glabra".

The tree grows well as a tropical ornamental in moist, frost-free areas, and can be started from seed or cutting. It is a durable plant and adapts well to different conditions. The plant requires bright light, but not direct sunlight. When grown indoors it requires a very gradual introduction to direct sunlight outdoors to reduce the chances of sunburning its leaves. This tree thrives in both common potting soil and water in a hydroponic system.

The plant grows well in bright light, but also tolerates partial shade at room temperatures from 12 °C through 25 °C. A plant's leaves may turn yellow and fall when days are shorter in autumn which is not a sign of disease, and the plant will restart its growth without problem the following spring. A tree is mature when 4–5 years old. It produces its first fruit in spring and fall. Furthermore, it can withstand temperatures as low as 5 °C without losing its leaves, although people recommended not growing it below 12 °C as an orangery tree, the ideal culture temperature being about 20 °C all year round with high humidity. An occasional weak frost can cause it to lose its leaves, and it grows new leaves in the following spring.

This species is occasionally cultivated for its nuts, which grow in a large, woody capsule. The nuts are light brown, striped with white, about 2–3 cm long, and embedded in a spongy and fibrous pericarp. The capsule is not eaten. The nuts develop within until the capsule bursts and releases them. The nuts are considered edible, with a flavor similar to a European chestnut. Some people grind the nuts and use them in a hot drink. They are toxic to rats in the raw state, but are consumed by people raw or roasted.

== Potential health risks ==
The presence of cyclopropenoid fatty acids (CPFAs) in the nuts has been used to state that the nuts are not edible and not suitable for human consumption, despite the nut being eaten or used in medicine. At least one review indicates that CPFAs are carcinogenic, co-carcinogenic, and have medical and other effects on animals; according to this review, "CPFA in food is dangerous to human health". Out of six rats tested in a study of P. aquatica, five died after consuming the nuts. The surviving rat had enlarged organs including the stomach, liver, pancreas, kidneys, lungs and also had spleen atrophy. Research on the health effects of eating the nuts on humans is lacking, but there are some studies regarding nutritional facts and food utilization.

== Gallery ==
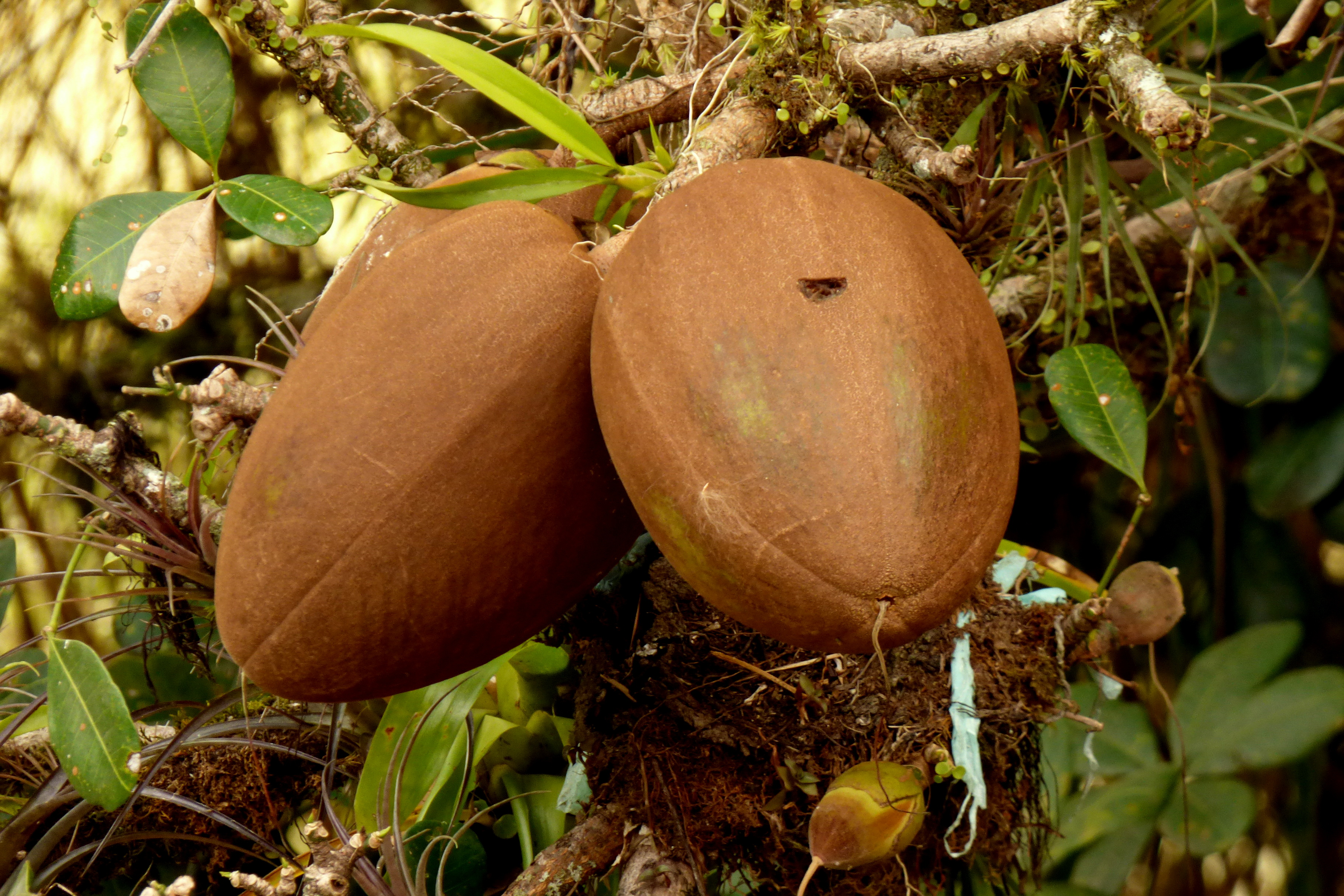
fruit

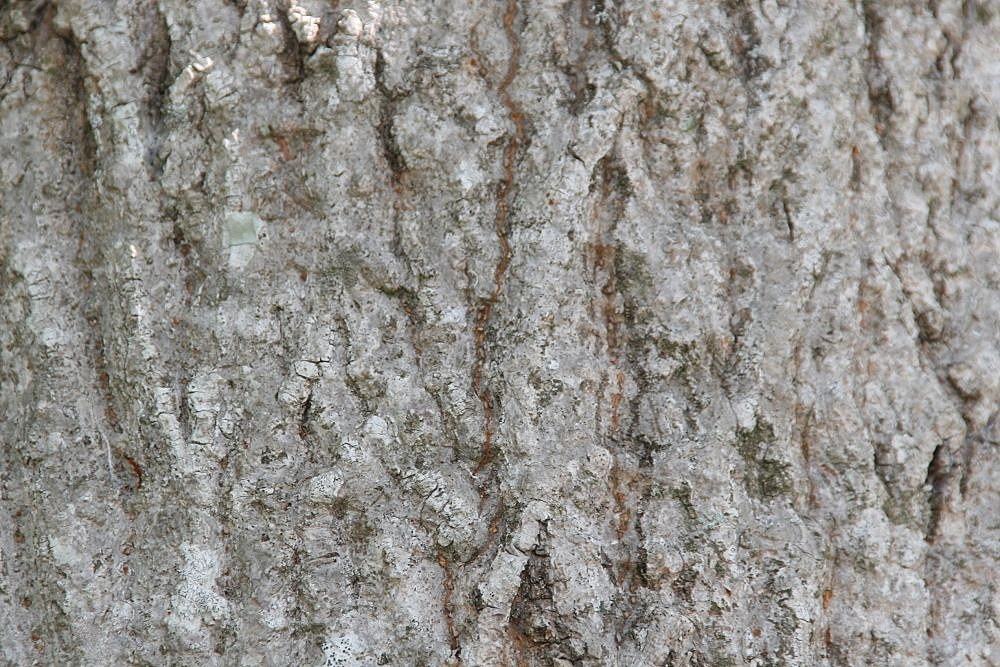
bark

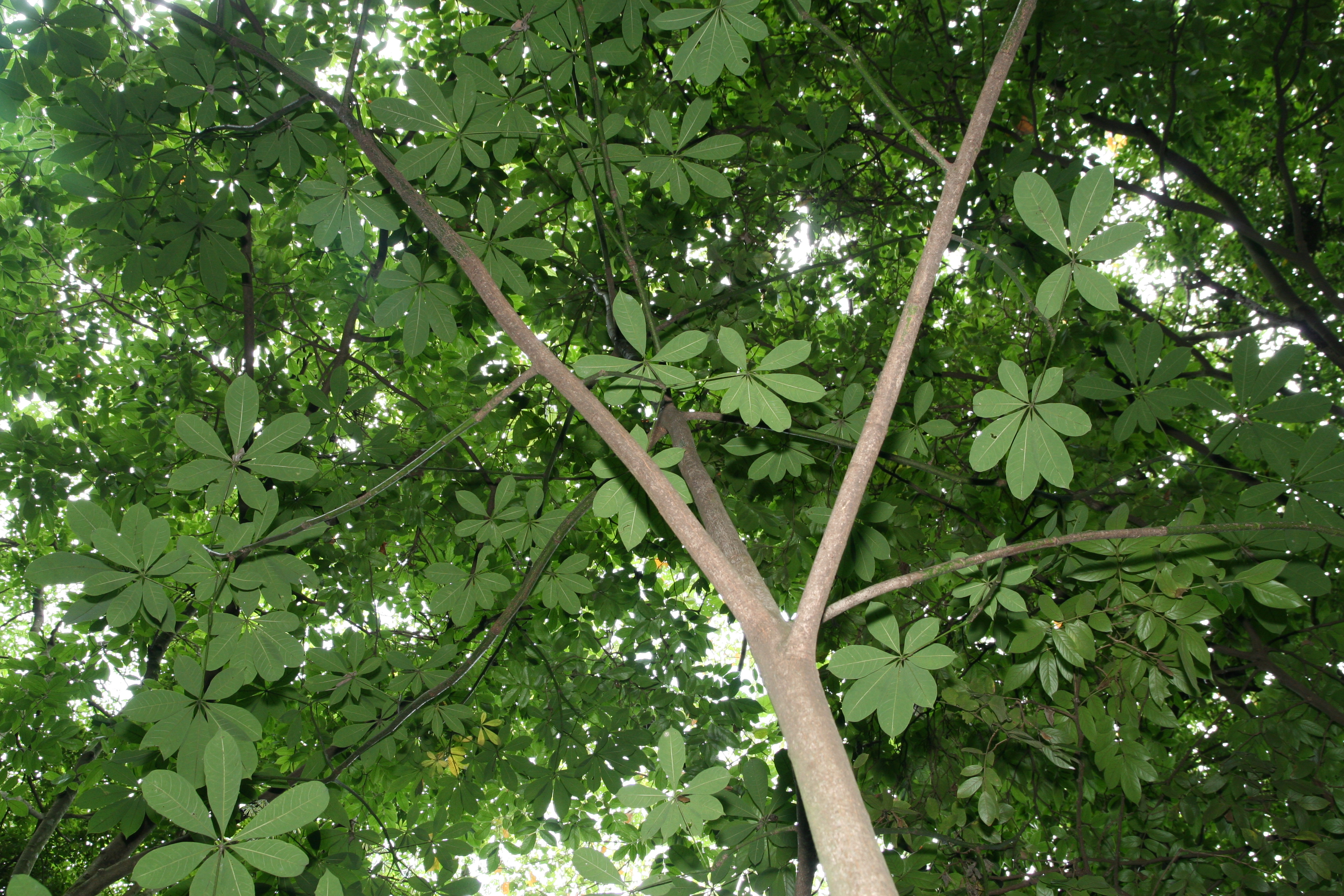
foliage

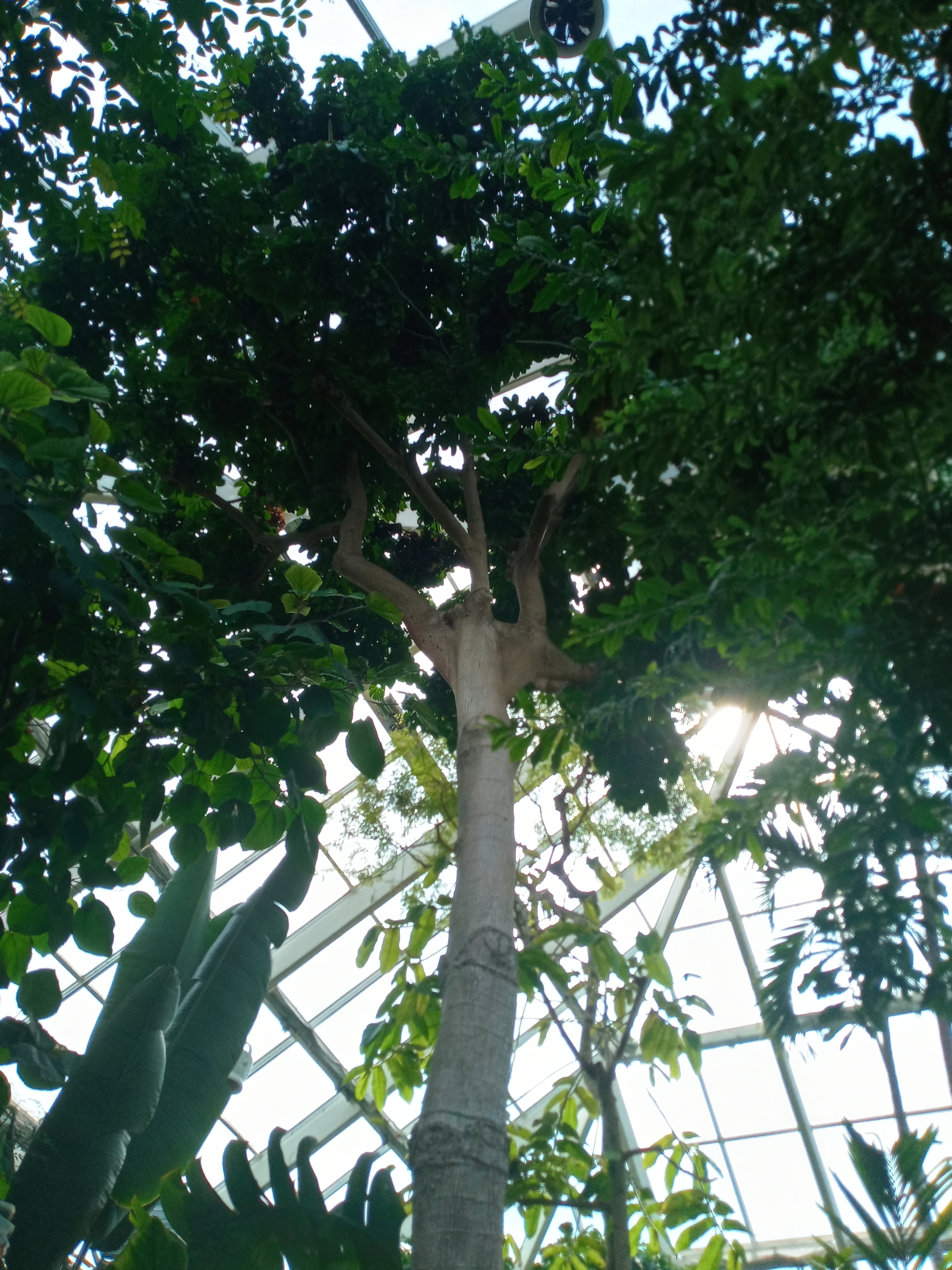
A cultivated tree in a palm house
