= Manuel Córdova-Rios =

Peruvian Amazonian herbalist

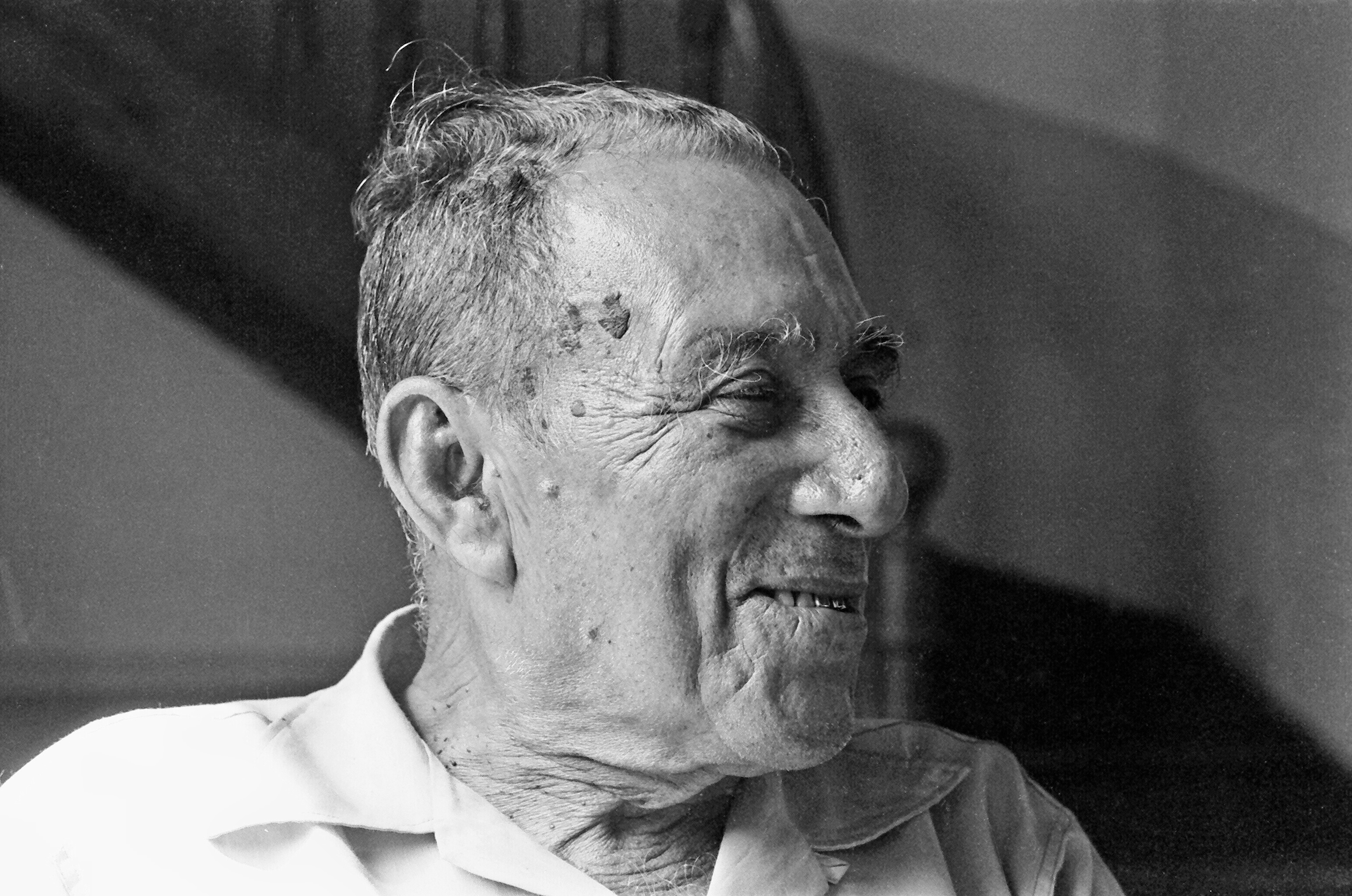
Córdova-Rios in 1976

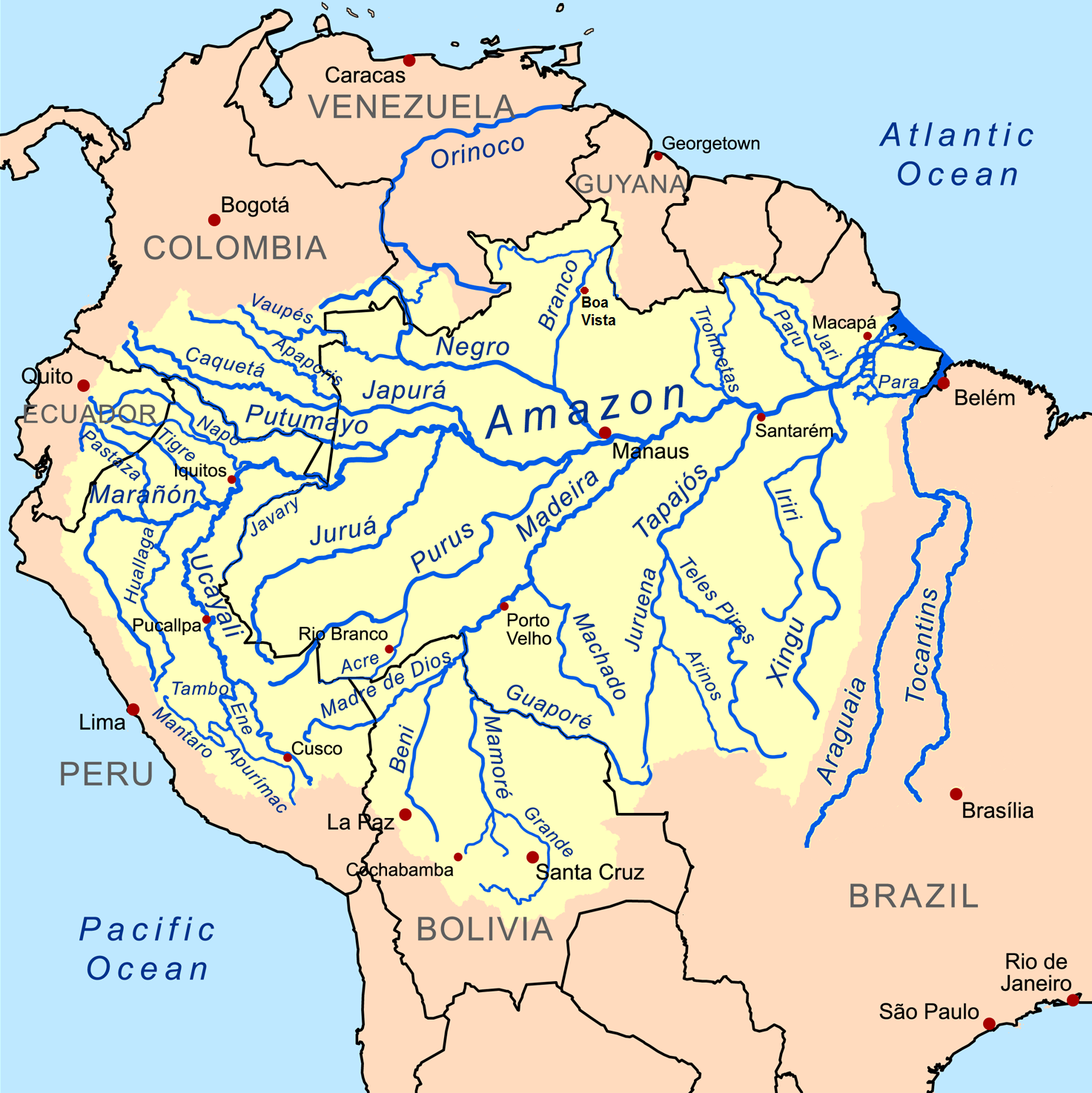
Rivers and cities of the Amazon Basin and vicinity

Manuel Córdova-Rios (November 22, 1887 – November 22, 1978) was a vegetalista (herbalist) of the upper Amazon, and the subject of several popular books.

As a teenage mestizo of Iquitos he joined a company's work party to set up camp in the neighboring Amazon forest. They commercially cut rubber trees. He was, however, captured by a native tribe, and apparently lived among them for seven years. The elderly chief taught him in intensive private sessions traditional tribal knowledge: medicinal plants of the jungle, and ways of leadership. The small tribe knew skills for hunting in the jungle, which he learned well, acquiring the name Ino Moxo (black jaguar). The chief also led night-long group sessions under the influence of ayahuasca to sharpen prowess in the hunt. After the chief's death, Córdova was acknowledged as leader of the tribe for some years.

He then returned to local Peruvian life, married and raised a family. Eventually he became well known in the upper Amazon for his success as a curandero (healer), due to his knowledge and use of the chief's herbal teachings. Also he regularly sent medicinal plants to New York.

In the early 1960s he met an American forester, Bruce Lamb (1913–1993), a veteran of many years in the Amazon. Lamb then wrote Córdoba's life story in Wizard of the Upper Amazon (1971), and about his healing arts in Rio Tigre and Beyond (1985). Both books sold well and drew academic interest, acclaim, and some controversy. Later, a Peruvian poet-novelist and an American poet each published literary works focused on Córdova.

== Early years ==
=== Amazon youth and caucho ===
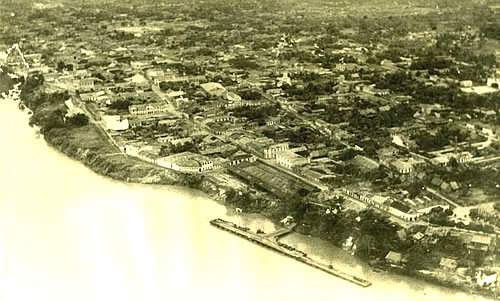
Iquitos on the Amazon, first decade of 20th century

Until the age of twelve Manuel Córdova-Ríos attended schools in Iquitos his birthplace. The major Peruvian city on the Amazon, it then had perhaps 40,000 inhabitants. His Uru mother came from Moyobamba, a town west of Iquitos in the Andes foothills between the Río Marañón and Río Huallaga. His father worked in the surrounding forest as a tapper (Spanish: cauchero; Portuguese: seringeiros) or cutter of wild rubber trees. His origins lay near Arequipa (a provincial capital near the ocean and far to the south).

The thriving Amazon trade in rubber (Sp: caucho) had come upriver to Iquitos circa 1880 from Brazil. Eventually his mother let him go with his elder sister Mariana and her husband Lino Vela into the hinterland to learn the booming rubber business. In the small town of Iberia on the Río Tapiche the couple's trading post served rubber tappers, who would bring in their harvest of latex to sell, as well as to buy gear and supplies. Before long young Manuel went further into the bush, by boat with a company of four others under Roque to a remote, makeshift caucho camp by the Río Juruá near the Peru–Brazil border. From here they could fan out into the unexploited forest in search of wild rubber trees.

=== Captured by a forest tribe ===
On a day when it was Manuel's turn to cook and clean camp, he was alone while the others hunted for rubber. Surprised suddenly by the deft appearance of a group of forest natives (about 15 in number), Manuel was quickly seized and nearby weapons removed. With hands bound, he was required to run at an accelerated pace along with the silent tribal party, through the forest southward for several days and nights, stopping only briefly. Exhausted and disoriented, he surmised that his fellow caucheros had been killed; he later noticed his captors with their weapons. After about nine days on foot, they reached a small village in a jungle clearing (called Xanadá he later learned) located near the Peruvian headwaters of the Río Purús. It was about 250 km. from the caucho camp. An elderly chief greeted him and expressed kindness toward him. His name was Xumu Nawa. Manuel was naturally apprehensive. Eventually the village came to accept him, and slowly Manuel began to be reconciled to his new situation; ceremonies were held. Village children became casual and friendly, and the chief started to teach him the tribal language.

== Life in Huni Kui village ==
Being young Manuel Córdova-Ríos, after adjustments, quickly took to the tribal ways of the Huni Kui ["real people" or "true, genuine people", also "chosen people"]. A readily apparent difference was that the Huni Kui for the most part went naked. Their home was the tropical rainforest, which Córdoba had only known from a Peruvian perspective. He learned their language and their hunting styles, ate the diet of cultivated vegetables, wild fruits and game meat, lived their village life, and went without clothes. He retained inwardly, however, a submerged but unresolved conflict, due to the supposed harm caused by his initial capture. The chief Xumu taught Manuel Córdova-Rios much traditional knowledge of the tribe, which constituted valuable lessons enriching Manuel's entire life. Here Xumu Nawa might be further described as a shaman, or as a curaca, a title for leaders used among tribes of the upper Amazon.

=== Ayahuasca and hunting ===
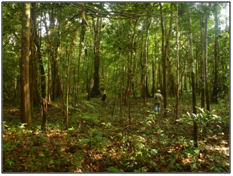
A lowland forest landscape, Peruvian Amazon

A major occupation of the men was hunting, which provided a substantial part of the Huni Kui diet. Xumu the elderly chief would, periodically, lead the hunters in secluded, group sessions calculated to renew and improve their hunting skills. The preparation usually required, e.g., a purge of the bowels, followed by taking only selected foods, and sexual abstinence. In a clearing away from the village a dark-green drink was made mostly from vines of ayahuasca [HK: nixi honi] and chacruna leaves, boiled slowly over a low fire. It was poured into small palm-nut cups and given to the hunters, who sat encircling the fire. Accompanied softly by the others, the chief would begin singing his peculiar chants. At his discretion he'd employ the songs to alter the atmosphere of the gathering or modify the pace of the group.

The tribal hunters then entered into what may be described as a shared experience of vision. After an initial chaotic flux of organic images and designs, arabesques in blues and greens, a collective fantasy developed in which a 'parade' of birds and animals began to pass into the group's awareness. Following the chief's cue the hunters would shift the chant, enabling them to use the particular song (icaro) associated with each of the jungle creatures as it passed before them. Evidently the group had evolved this method to coordinate their visions, so that they could then collectively imagine a similar scene of forest life. Accordingly, following their group witness of the wild creatures one after another, each of the tribal members was better able to appreciate the instinctual nature of such an animal or a bird, and the stealth and techniques of their fellow hunters, all of which could be scrutinized and delicately appraised in each mind's eye. Several of such hunting scenes, later reconveyed in elaborated stories told after the session, might then be carefully assimilated. The experience naturally worked to coach each hunter to improve his skills, e.g., shooting arrows that hit their mark, or refashioning his tracking intuition.

This ayahuasca experience, which was from time to time repeated for the tribe's hunters, fascinated and enchanted the young initiate, Manuel Córdoba. By this process, the Huni Kui men worked together to sharpen and refresh the tribe's hunting skills. Afterwards, hunters divided into small groups and put to the test their newly enhanced ability to find and bag the forest's wild game, and so to increase each family's ability to survive. In one of these hunts, Nixi and Txaxo told Manuel how to pursue feral pigs and, after tracking a large band, shot arrows bringing down a few quick targets. Nixi and Txaxo further described roving habits of the forest pigs.

The hunters also maintained a tradition of reciting to each other well-known tribal legends of the hunt, as well as personal stories. Córdova often heard such stories told in gatherings, e.g., inside a thatched house by the fire during a cold, rainy night, or in the village clearing on balmy nights during the dry season. Each seemed to have several favorites. The Peruvian youth listened wide-eyed as various jungle hunters spun their tales: Awawa Xuko ("[largest] Toucan") spoke about a brief fight between jaguar and anteater; Natakoa ("Forest Man") told of a harpy eagle's catch of a howler monkey; and chief Xumu Nawa related a story about how, as a youth in company with the former chief Awawa Toto, they tracked a special band of howler monkeys.

=== Huni Kui traditions ===
In addition to the hunting stories, Córdova heard about legendary scenes and mythic figures, and talk about social ceremonies which he later he witnessed. Learned were the tribal origins of the Huni Kui during a time when humans could talk with animals, and about how people did not die as they do now, but instead "Old men changed into boys, old women into girls". This was before the tribal loss of immortality. One narrative described the first war, started by wife-stealing; chief Xumu associated this with the tribe's recent misfortunes stemming from the invasion of commercial "rubber cutters" (Sp: "caucheros"). Another story told of the negative behavior suffered by a man named Macari, who had made improper use of ayahuasca.

The teenager Nawatoto (HK: "Hawk"), the son of Natakoa and his wife Yawanini, had become a good hunter and was deemed ready to marry by his parents, which was later affirmed by the elder chief Shumu (Xumu Nawa) and a group of older men and women. From a different segment of the Huni Kui a girl named Irikina was selected and the two families agreed. A brief marriage ceremony was later held, followed by a large tribal celebration involving a great feast, dancing, and drinking. After birth of the first child, the husband obtained his own hunting territory and the wife her own plot in the village garden.

=== Ayahuasca lore and icaros ===
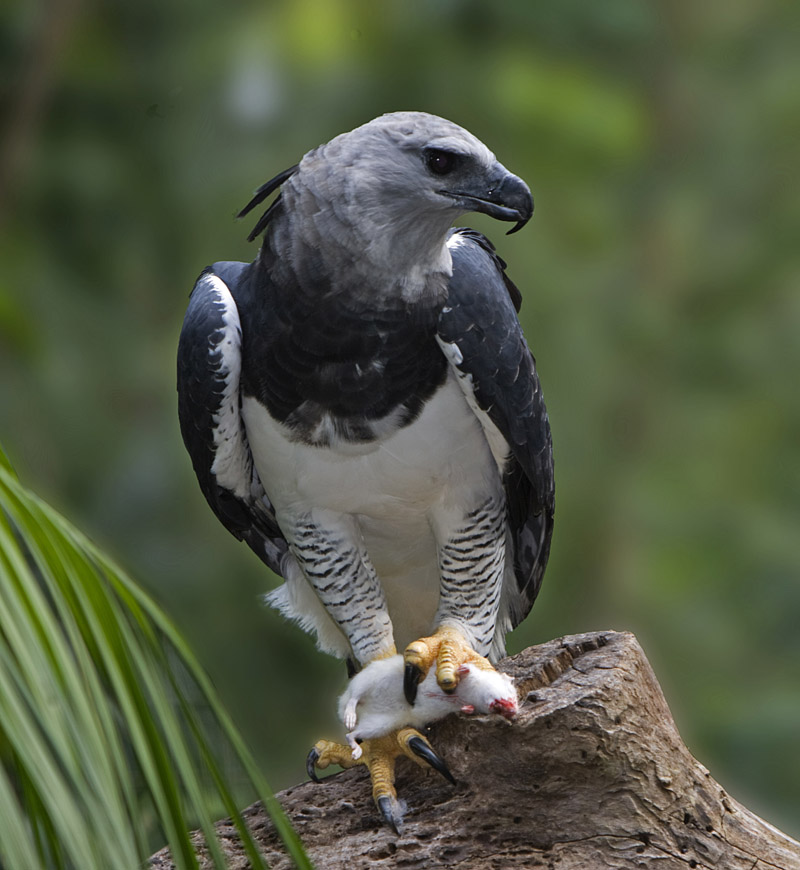
Harpy eagle, in sessions of ayahuasca, called forth in vision by the hawk icaro.

By private instruction, the elder chief Xumu trained Manuel Córdova using "a series of incredible sessions with the extract of the vision vine, nixi honi xuma" (i.e., ayahuasca). The idiom Huni Kui is a dialect of Amahuaca which is part of the Panoan languages. The word ayahuasca is Quechua: aya meaning "spirit", "ancestor", or "dead person"; and huasca signifying "vine". Xumu transmitted to Córdova the vital skills and customs of the tribe, regarding the use of ayahuasca, in addition to the chief's extraordinary knowledge of the plants of the jungle. During this introductory period, a private teaching session began in the morning and ended the next morning. They held outside the village once every eight days for a 'month', followed by a month off. Again Manuel was required to follow a strict dietary regime during the sessions. As the training lasted many months, Manuel at times became "nervous, high strung, and afraid of going insane" but the chief and his small group of elder women assuaged his fears. These sessions were held in a secluded place in the forest, especially selected and provisioned.

The chief closely supervised the preparation of the brew of ayahuasca vines and the important admixture of chacruna leaves. A particular type of chacruna used by chief Xumu, Psychotria viridis, was later favored by Córdova. Primarily ayahuasca, but either of these two plants, or their comibination, are also called yagé, among other names. Córdova learned the great care that must be taken in order to respectfully collect the ayahuasca vine (about the diameter of a wrist) and chacruna plants, then mash, mix, and cook these ingredients properly. Early on Xumu had assigned the tribe's expert, Nixi Xuma Waki ("Maker of the Vine Extract"), to instruct him how. Medical studies of these drugs have since demonstrated that the visionary effects of the ayahuasca and chacruna brew are produced mainly by the latter, with the former here enabling and enhancing the imaginative clarity. Hence the extraordinary experience produced was "the result of a synergetic mechanism of the chemicals present in two different plants, an example of the sophisticated pharma knowledge of the Amerindian shamans."

While secluded in a jungle clearing, united "through some telepathic code of ancient man" Córdova felt Xumu transmitting tribal knowledge. He received "accumulated wisdom of many generations of ancestral forest dwellers, tapping biological wisdom from some source unknown". The older chief coached the young Manuel in the use of his imagination, steering it so as to refine his perception, and guiding him so he'd intuit its utility. Plants were shown and identified, then visualized. Their particular health benefits and especially their healing properties were discussed; various plants were related to specific diseases and their symptoms, imparting the ability to make an herbal diagnosis. To the plants the chief sang his chants (called icaros), and taught many to Córdova, along with their meaning and healing effects. Later Córdova in his work as a curandero primarily relied on the icaros taught him by Xumu. Córdova also learned how to listen to the plants, especially to ayahuasca.

"In the case of mestizo Peruvian shamans, the ayahuasca plant, like other visionary plants, is itself the teacher of the aspiring shaman who, among other things, learns supernatural melodies or icaros from the plant." The special functional uses of different icaros are "as varied as the needs of the shaman". The key ayahuasca chants and songs "sway the sequence and content of the internal vision", remarked Córdova, who stated also, "This power once exerted, though perhaps subtle in its effect, does not easily disappear." "The icaros constitute the quintessence of shamanic power."

=== Hostilities, and firearms ===
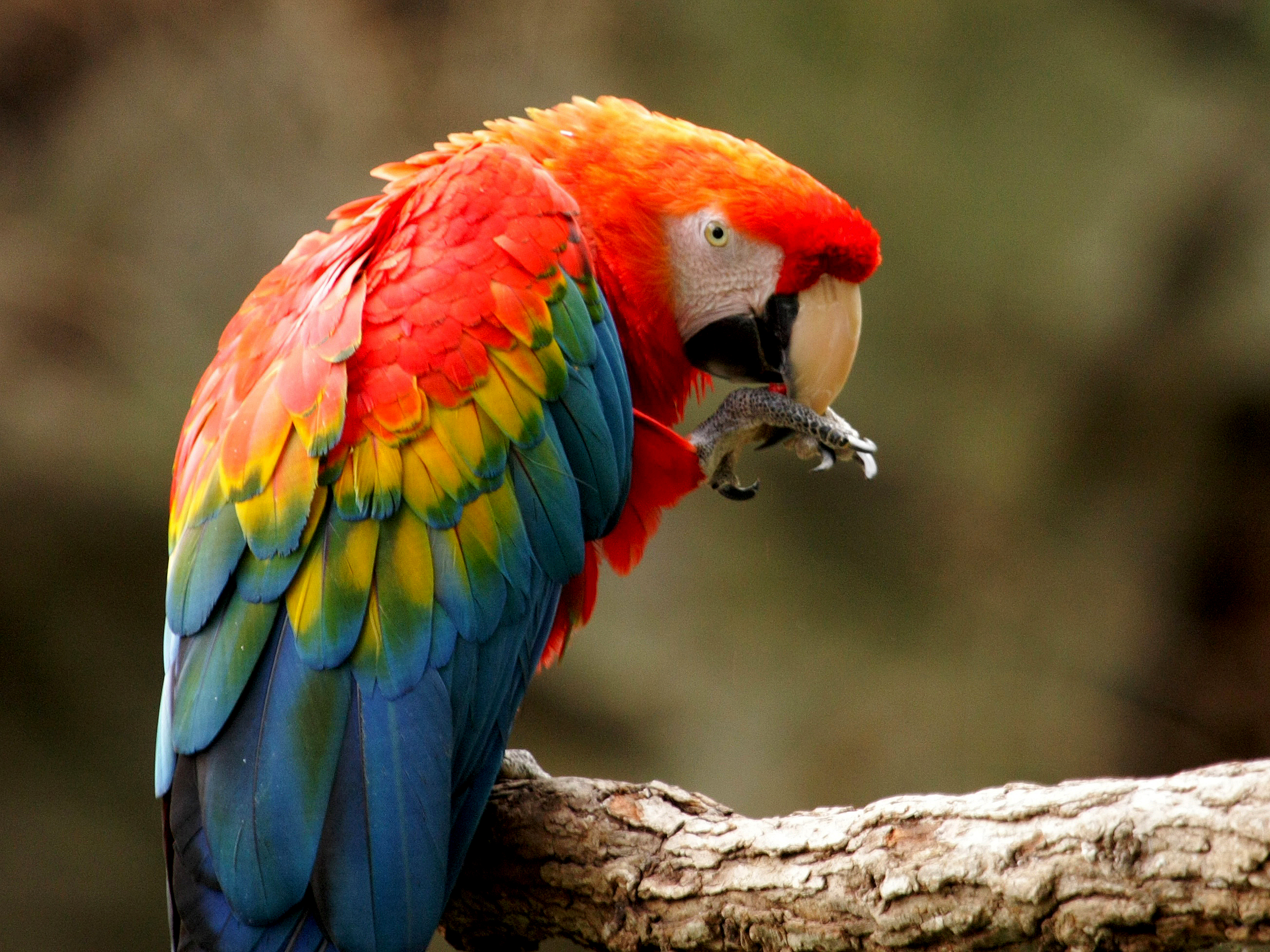
Blue and red macaw: omen of a tribal enemy.

Signs of a hostile "encroachment on tribal hunting territory" were noticed. A search party discovered a "small camp of two houses" about "three days away from our village". Chief Xumu spoke to the heads of families about their past struggles against enemies. Preparations were made for a raid by a party of 25 men. The women painted the warriors' faces and bodies with a blue-black stain in finely drawn designs. At a meeting the tribe swore to make war, finger-tasting a liquid tobacco mixture. The raiding party, including Manuel, used bird calls as they approached near the hostile camp, and their scouts killed an enemy lookout. Yet as they entered the camp it was deserted. When the Huni Kui warriors returned home to the village, a victory celebration followed.

Eventually Manuel Córdova learned of the Huni Kui's past skirmishes and battles, including the names of several enemy tribes. Some forest neighbors had gotten hold of firearms which had given them a deadly advantage in warfare against the Huni Kui. Most significant, however, was the defeat of the Huni Kui by Brazilian caucheros armed with rifles, resulting in the loss of life, loss of captives, and loss of tribal territory which caused the tribe's migration. Much later Manuel heard the chief describe as a primary reason for his abduction from the caucho camp: to somehow obtain firearms for the Huni Kui.

=== Tribal trade in rubber ===
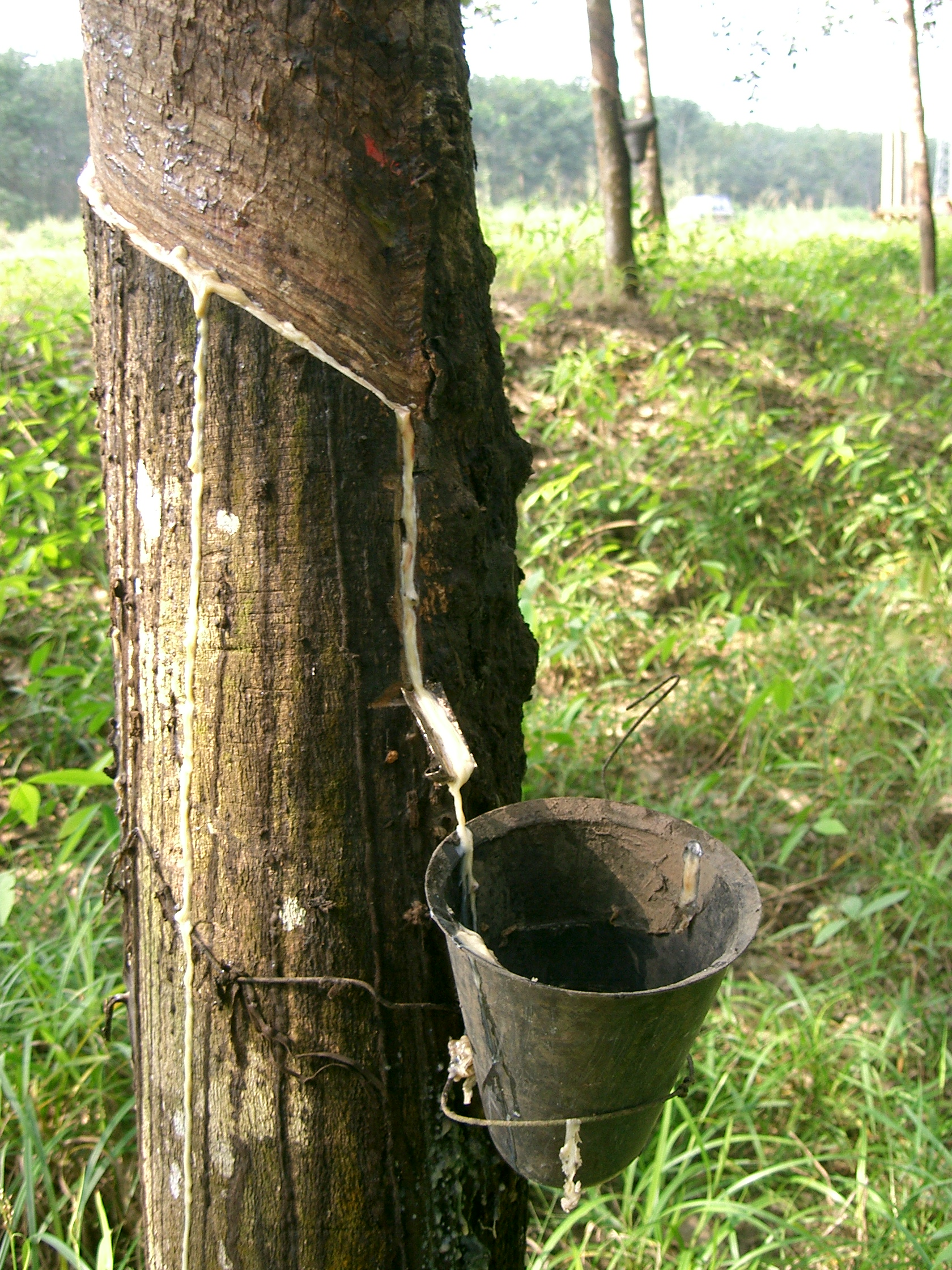
Rubber tree being tapped for latex.

Subtly prompted by the old tribal chief Xumu, the 17-year-old Manuel suddenly came to the realization that the Huni Kui could search for rubber trees in the forest, cut them down to collect the 'sap' and so obtain the valuable trade good: latex (Spanish: caucho). With his help, the tribe could sell the rubber at a river trading post, and with the proceeds purchase firearms and implements. Because of his proposal, Manuel felt he had won some sense of control over his own future within the tribe, which gave "new meaning to life" and made him "inwardlly greatly excited". First Manuel worked with Huni Kui hunters to sharpen the dull metal and stone tools they had, in order to use them on the rubber trees. Manuel taught his tribe how. After many weeks a large stockpile of latex was collected which had been turned into 20 solid chunks each estimated to weigh over 20 kilos.

Xumu selected a tribal party to carry the rubber to trade, one chunk per man. They then traveled on foot to the frontier of their tribal lands and beyond through (what Manuel thought was) "trackless forest" moving northeast. Eventually they came to a stop close to an 'outpost' for the rubber trade, on the Río Purús in Brazil, just across the Peruvian border. There Córdova for the first time in years put on western clothes (ill-fitting, given him by the chief), and paddled alone aboard an improvised three-log raft loaded with chunks of latex to the river 'business office'. Indians were forbidden by law from purchasing firearms. Córdoba avoided the manager's inquisitive questions, and sold Rodrigues the harvested rubber at the going price, which was more than enough. He purchased a box of six rifles, two shotguns, ammunition, as well as other goods (axes, machetes, mirrors, and beads), and put on account his remaining credit balance. Córdoba saw a calendar: June 15, 1910; it had been two and a half years since his capture. When the party returned to the village, the whole tribe celebrated in its most grand style.

Soon after his return from the tribe's first caucho trading venture, Manuel Córdova married. Chief Shumu (Xumu) had selected Huaini (HK: "Fragrant Flower") and introduced the situation to Manuel. Of course, he already knew Huaini. They had first met shortly after his arrival in the village of Xanadá when he was exhausted and disoriented following his abduction; she was the girl who had then given Manuel a sweet banana drink. Their continuing "strong feeling of affection" for each other pleased the chief.

=== Chief Xumu and ayahuasca ===
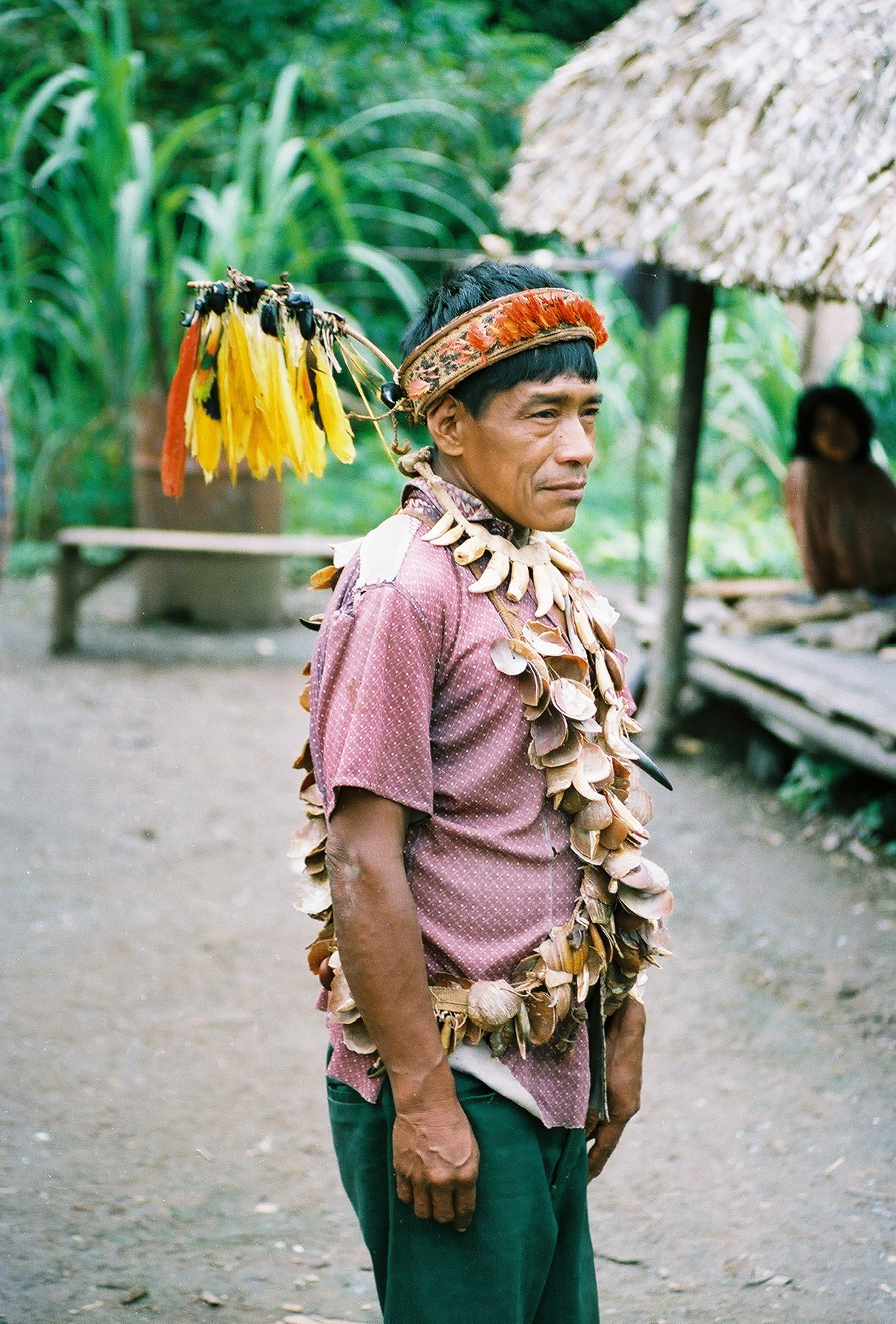
Shaman of Urarina tribe, 1988. Comparable perhaps to Xumu of the Huni Kui, who seemed both shaman and chief. Nearly a century later, this shaman wears western clothing with his tribal gear. The Urarina of the Peruvian Amazon appear to be not closely related to Huni Kui.

In the group ayahuasca sessions, the nature and timing of the visions seen by each member was significantly influenced by the purposeful chanting of the guide. The group would join in these songs, called icaros. In his guiding role, chief Xumu Nawa apparently employed different chants or icaros in order to steer and coordinate the subjective imaginations of individual tribal members, so that the ayahuasca sessions would become a shared experience among those participating. "Soon subtle but evocative chants led by the chief took control of the progression of our visions. Embellishments to both the chants and the visions came from the participants." An anthropologist of the upper Amazon wrote:

"Córdoba-Rios' account evokes for the reader the immense importance that plant hallucinogens can have among groups where they are centrally incorporated into all aspects of social life. [He] illustrates how non-literate groups... use the visionary effects of the plant to intensify perception of forest animals, their habits and peculiarities, and to increase their awareness of individual interactions within the group, thereby facilitating political control in the absence of formal leadership structures. ... The preparation and use of the plant is ritualized and accompanied by musical chants... [managed] by the guiding shaman to control the progression of visions and, in effect, to program them toward culturally-valued stereotypic patterns which aid in specific problems... ."

Lamb commented that chief Xumu led the Huni Kui "with great finess and subtlety, seeking consensus on every important action after long discussion with his people." His practice in guiding ayahuasca sessions with carefully timed icaros undoubtedly assisted his ability to persuade. When the hunters would gather to tell their tales of tracking and encountering game, Xumu might also recite a story of his own. Often he then would speak of the former chief, Awawa Toto. Chief Xumu employed these ayahuasca sessions to augment his authority.

"I sense, my friend", Córdova said to me, "that you find it difficult to grasp the significance of the influence that a maestro ayahuasquero has over the minds of a group of people who participate with him in a vision session of the kind I have described. This power once exerted, though perhaps subtle in its effect, does not easily disappear. As you know, in my youth I was held in its spell for several years."

Following chief Xumu's death, Córdoba followed his instructions and assumed the duties of tribal chief. Eventually he discovered, while conducting a group ayahuasca session, by using icaros, "that the visions obeyed the songs and chants, or perhaps it would be better to say that by means of the chants it was possible to influence the course of the visions". At the next ayahuasca session in which he guided tribal members, Córdoba tested his new understanding about the steering of the visions beheld by the group. He states, "I chanted what I wanted to see and found that each time... no matter how involved or strange the visions, they obeyed my wishes as I expressed them in song." Accordingly, his authority increased. "Once the men realized that I had achieved domination over their dreams, they considered me a true magician, a position superior to theirs."

=== Migrations of Huni Kui ===
In the recent past, well before Córdova's arrival, the tribe had been living in settlements across the border, by the banks of a river in Brazil, the Tarauacá [HK: Hoonwa-ia]. Commercial rubber agents, however, began appearing in the vicinity. As these groups of caucheros increased in number, their frictions with the people of the forest might escalate. Some of these intruders began launching armed and murderous assaults against various native tribes, in particular, against the Huni Kui. Incapable of mounting an adequate defense, tribal subgroups under chief Xumu decided to move upriver to escape these aggressors, who killed and who also took captive women and children. Soon this new refuge was also attacked by rubber interests. In addition, neighboring tribes had gotten hold of modern firearms and thus gained an intolerable advantage in the recurring violence of intertribal warfare. While again migrating upriver to the west, a large boa was found and the refugees, taking it as good luck, named their subgroups the Donowan after the boa.

These Donowan continued upriver, to a more inaccessible location, one near the upland headwaters of several rivers; "they withdrew to this most isolated area away from navigable streams to avoid contact with the invading rubber cutters". In the process, they were joined by two local tribes (the Xabo and Ixabo: "Palm Tree" people) who also spoke the same Huni Kui language. Together they founded a new settlement which they named Xanadá ("Place to Begin Again"), led by Xumu their chief. Nonetheless, stored in the wounded tribal memory of the Huni Kui remained grievous, emotional scenes concerning family catastrophes, hence instinctual motivation to avenge the tribe's losses: the "murdered relatives and stolen children", and their former lands where they had hunted, tilled, and gathered.

=== Passing of chief Xumu ===
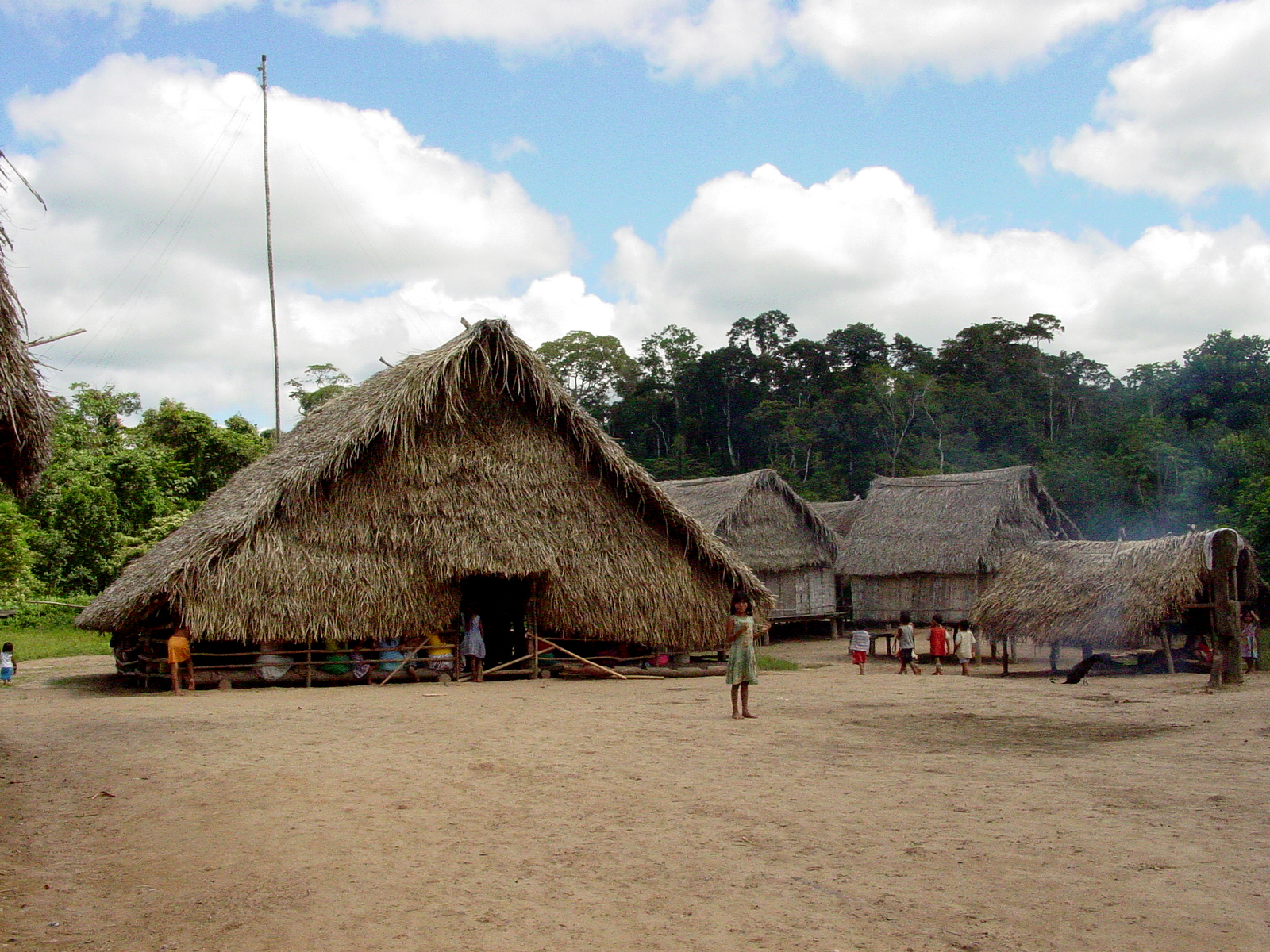
Recent photo of the Huni Kui village.

The elderly tribal chief Xumu became ill and began to weaken further. He sat for days in his hut, attended by an inner group of elderly village women. At his passing, the tribe went into mourning. His body was prepared for burial by being washed and wrapped, then lifted up to the ceiling of the hut, where smoke from the fire is thick, which cured it for many months. All activity ceased. His life and guidance was fondly recalled; nostalgia gripped the Huni Kui. The tribe raised chants amid collective cries of lamentation. In remembrance people spoke of Xumu's leadership during the troubles and sorrows of the recent migrations. Later his stiffened body was oiled, so that his joints could be moved to put him in a sitting position; then he is placed into a large ceramic jar. His belonging are also put in, and food, and then a lid was sealed using melted tree resin. A ceremony was held in which the chief was buried at the edge of the village. Days passed; eventually the village's store of food became exhausted, and the communal activity of tribal life resumed.

=== Córdova's time as chief ===
Chief Xumu's funeral ceremony was prepared quietly and then held by the tribe, with spontaneous mourning manifested. After a time, Córdova (Ino Moxo) was asked by the hunters to lead an ayahuasca session of 'group dreaming', in order to reinvigorate and sharpen their tracking and shooting skills. Over a year had passed since the tribe engaged in the rubber trade. Need arose for more machetes and other implements. Córdova managed the village work and the forest collection of latex, then its transport to the river trading post. Once there he went alone, as before, to sell the caucho and to buy the goods. Córdova learned the price of rubber had fallen by almost half.

Tribal festivities were held to celebrate the new purchases from their caucho trade. The days of drinking resulted and the usual feuds erupting among intoxicants. Córdova found it difficult to satisfactory settle the angry quarrels. Later he led another ayahuasca session, where his skills noticeably improved, as he used the chanting of icaros to orchestrate the group's flow of shared images. Tribal members came to consider the Ino Moxo a master at it. Eventually, new insights about the social life of the tribe allowed Códova to improve his ability to mediate the repetitive disputes. Córdova also was called upon to practice the art of healing he learned from chief Xumu. He began to place some reliance on an elderly woman, Owa Iuxabo (Old Mother). Yet other difficulties developed.

One group of Huni Kui, who appeared more violent by nature, had separated from the others, and was absent for many days. When they returned, a village woman hinted to Córdova that they had raided a camp of Peruvian rubber tappers in the vicinity, ignoring his prior instructions. Córdova (Ino Moxo) called a tobacco meeting with them in which he recalled his careful training by the former chief, and his own ability to get arms and trade goods. Without drama, he implied his knowledge of their raid, and that if they continued raiding "evil spirits and disastrous times would destroy the tribe". These members joined the discussion, saying many caucheros were now withdrawing from the neighboring forests; more importantly, they dwelled on the unavenged deaths and other losses suffered by the Huni Kui in the past. In the prior attacks by rubber cutters, women and children had been taken, others killed or went missing. The tribe had felt compelled to abandon its village and lands (see above "Migrations"). In reply Córdova, in order to re-establish social solidarity, selected a tribal party of 25 which travelled to where their former settlements had been, i.e., to where they had been driven out. When the party reached their old lands they found abandoned caucho camps. Córdova moved to quell talk of violent vengeance-seeking, warning it would likely provoke a devastating response by the more numerous, better-armed caucheros against their current home Xanadá. The party then returned home, where Córdova was told that enemy tribes had been probing the Huni Kui defenses.

Meanwhile, anonymous attempts continued to be made on Córdova's life; arrows were shot at him, but by whom remained a mystery: probably a rival tribe. The late chief Xumu had seen his only son fall victim to such deadly sniper attacks. During the tribe's next rubber-trade venture, Córdova found that latex prices continued to plummet, and that many commercial caucheros were leaving. Later, when an arrow almost hit Córdova while in the forest, the tribe became anxious and demanded that he remain in the village for protection. As if imprisoned there by his tribe, he began to feel a sense of foreboding. Córdova (Ino Moxo) then prepared himself alone for an ayahuasca session: therein he saw the deceased chief Xumu and the black jaguar; he also a vision his mother ill and dying.

=== Return to Iquitos ===
Seal of Manaus

Another cache of latex was collected and then a tribal party carried it overland to their destination: the trading post on the banks of the Río Purús. Halting nearby, they built a raft to float the latex the rest of the way; as usual, Córdova put on clothes and took the rubber in alone. Its price had continued its decline, and the latex had little of its expected value. Docked by the outpost was the Filó, a Brazilian launch. Rodrigues told him it would soon be leaving downriver. With some purchased utility goods, Córdova returned to the waiting tribal party. He then misdirected their attention by telling them that he must go again to buy new guns. Yet back at the jungle trading post the next morning, he instead booked passage on the Filó. It took him to Manaus on the middle course of the Amazon River; this city was the commercial capital of the Amazon rubber boom. At Manaus Córdova went to the offices of Luzero-Rodrigues da Costa & Companhia, where he collected the balance due on account. Here he avoided informing an elder Rodrigues of his seven years in captivity, keeping the world of the Huni Kui hidden and apart. From Manaus Córdova proceeded westward, up the Amazon River to Iquitos in Peru. There he found his father living in the same home, who greeted him with an abraço, but learned to his sadness that his mother and a sister had died recently in an influenza epidemic.

Although Córdoba later dreamt about his time with the forest tribe, he remained ambivalent about the incident of his capture and life with the tribe. Once back home in Iquitos he did not try to return to the Huni Kui. He did keep an ear open for news about the tribe. Eventually he would refer to the Huni Kui as his "Indian captors" but also as "my group of Indians" and "our village". Yet he offered reasons to justify his escape. "My early family ties had been strong, and for this reason I probably never completely gave up on the idea of escape and return." On the other hand, he said that "if conditions had been different I might have stayed on in the forest for a long time". The most important condition, among several major ones, was that "our enemies there in the forest [were trying] to assassinate me and thus eliminate the source of firearms for my group of Indians". Later, when discussing his remarkable ability to effect cures, Córdoba would give the credit to chief Xumu of the Huni Kui, who was "the single most important influence on the rest of his life".

== Issue of authenticity ==
Córdova's story of his capture by, and years among, an indigenous tribe of the Peruvian Amazon was initially welcomed in the anthropological literature. Indeed, it was praised and recommended. Richard Evans Schultes, the celebrated authority on plants and drug extracts, particularly of the Amazon, about the Córdoba's 1971 book, states: "The numerous references to plants used by Amazonian Indians and more especially the interesting data on the hallucinogen ayahuasca provide significant ethnobotanical information."

About a decade after Lamb's first book, however, the well-regarded anthropologist Robert L. Carneiro published a piece highly critical of Córdova. It appeared in a popular book of essays mostly about another's somewhat similar claims of being initiated into Native American shamanism (yet of a different culture, locale and method). The book's editor Richard de Mille was a noted sceptic. Carneiro presented a list of major social customs he had observed, or had been told about, the Amahuaca [tribes associated with the Huni Kui], which differed markedly from those related by Córdova. Among these traits: no tribal chief, no tribal 'villages', different 'clothes', different weapons, different tribal ceremonies, no 'tobacco-licking' oath, different care of the dead, cannibalism, and different myths.

Carneiro also quoted a letter he received from a university psychiatrist of Lima, who had "interviewed" the elderly Córdova when he was "seriously ill". The letter characterized him as a vain rustic, and a trickster. Not willing to commit to an absolute denial of authenticity, Carneiro nonetheless states that Córdova's story "consists of fragmentary ethnographic tidbits gleamed indiscriminately from many tribes and encased in a matrix of personal fantasy." Carneiro had earlier published about a half-dozen articles on the 'Amahuaca tribes' based on his on-site study of them conducted about 50 years after Córdova's reported experiences. Later Lamb claimed that Carneiro spent "a very short time (about eight weeks)" with the Amahuaca, but Huxley writes that Carneiro and his wife Gertrude Dole were there at least "two months" during a return visit.

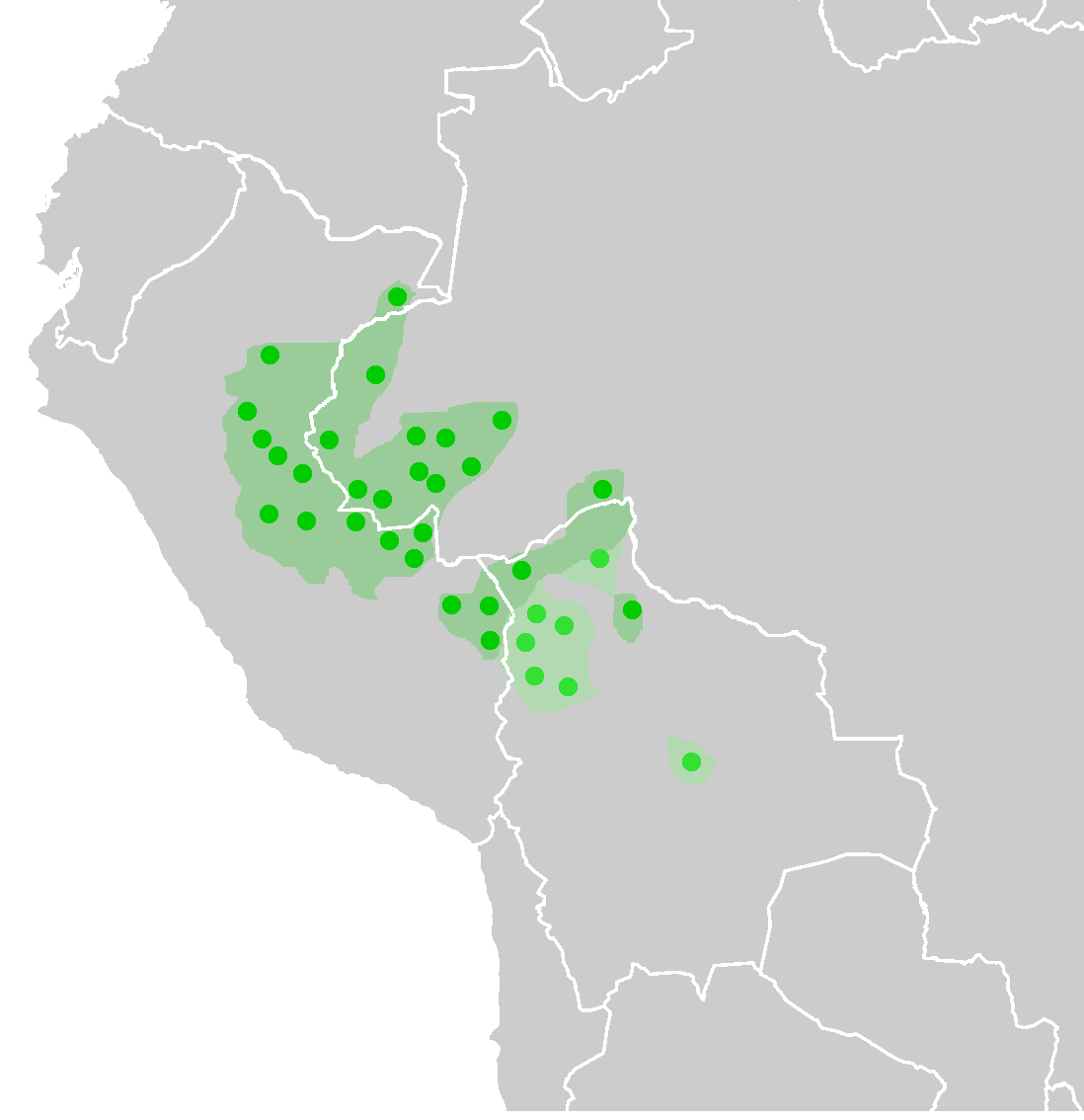
Panoan languages (dark green) and Takanan languages (light green). Circles indicate documented locations. Fields indicate approximate early probable locations. Panoan includes Huni Kui and Amahuaca tribes. It is a branch of the Pano-Tacanan language family.

Subsequently, the issue has been addressed by several different writers, with opinions divided. Jonathan Ott, an expert on entheogenic drugs including ayahuasca, recapitulates Carneiro's essay and seconds his conclusions. Nonetheless Ott later mentions Córdova positively as one of the mestizo ayahuasqueros who had left his "jungle home" yet "continued to practice shamanic healing in urban areas of Peru".

Lamb remained convinced of the truth of Córdova's account. During the 50 years between Córdova's capture and Carneiro's study, the Amahuaca tribes underwent radical social transformations, due to traumatic encounters with the modern world. Events during these 50 years were dramatic, as the Amazon rubber boom and other commercial penetration (e.g., subsequent oil production) caused sharp social disruption in the Peruvian Amazon: a catastrophic decline in Amahuaca tribal population, loss of most tribal lands, and cultural-economic assimilation.

Lamb also contends that from Córdova's book the Huni Kui tribe can be precisely determined from among neighboring tribes, but that Carneiro has instead incorrectly employed the ethnically ambiguous name of Amahuaca and so misidentified the Huni Kui, connecting them with other assorted tribes. Lamb criticized focus on the Amahuaca:

"Amahuaca, as it is used indiscriminately by many observers for various Panoan clans dwelling between the Río Juruá and Río Madre de Díos in Brazil and Peru, is a vague term with little meaning for designating any particular tribe or clan of Indians." "Whether or not [here the] Huni Kui can legitimately be called Amahuaca is difficult to determine... ."

Later Lamb pointed to a 1926 article, whose French author wrote professionally on Amazon tribes, where the Huni Kui were also called the Caxinaua and the Amahuaca. A current chapter "Huni Kuin (Kaxinawá)", in Povos Indígenas no Brasil, also identifies the Huni Kuin (with an added "n") as the Caxinauá or Kaxinawá. Yet the names of tribal peoples here (where some groups even now choose to remain hidden from moderns) retains an ambiguity due to ubiquitous conventions of self-naming.

"The first reports from travellers in the region contain a confusing mix of indigenous group names that persists even today. This stems from the fact that the names do not reflect a consensus between namer and named. The Pano namer calls (almost) all the others nawa, and himself and his kin huni kuin." "Huni Kuin [signifies] 'true humans'."

Lamb discusses, with multiple citations to anthropological literature, each of Carneiro's points about Huni Kui tribal customs: chiefs, village size, clothing, weapons, ceremonies, tobacco, funerals, cannibalism, and myths. He refers to Huxley's book about the Amahuaca, citing a description of a Rondowo village with fifty houses whose people were led by a curaca or tribal chief, who ruled on any conflicts with outsiders. Lamb thus relied on prior work of other scholars who clearly differed with Carneiro, and on tribal changes during the significant 50 year lapse.

Matthew Huxley's 1964 book Farewell to Eden sheds light on Amahuaca history, especially regarding kingship and settlements. Carneiro challenged Córdova's account regarding the existence of kings or villages among the Amahuaca; Carneiro claimed neither existed, "strictly speaking". Nonetheless, Huxley refers to oral histories taken in interviews with Amahuaca which indicate that in tribal lore "once there existed three, perhaps even four 'big' villages". One was called Xandia, said to be founded by "Iriya, the Rondowo's curaca (chief)" who was still alive in the early 1960s. He had persuaded two other Amahuaca subgroups to join Xandia which had "some 50 huts". All of these villages were eventually abandoned, probably due to "internal dissension" and to raids by caucheros during the rubber boom.

In this broad view Huxley generally substantiates Córdova's story, e.g., Huxley's Xandia suggests Córdova's Xanadá. Yet not all the details given by Huxley find a match in Córdova. About Carneiro's denial, "strictly speaking", of chiefs or villages among the Amahuaca: at one point Huxley infers an outline tribal history which suggests that toward mid-century, when Carneiro arrived (50 years after Córdova), outside contact had resulted in the fragmentation of the Amahuaca into very small groups.

Córdoba is discussed in a 1991 book co-written by Luis Eduardo Luna, an anthropologist familiar with his Peruvian Amazon, and Pablo Amaringo, a local practitioner of native healing arts. Córdoba's singular familiarity with the plants of the tropical forest is highly praised, as well as his insights about ayahuasca and his chanting guidance of group sessions. The authors note that Amazon herbalists would depend on the jungle tribes for their initial familiarity with the plants, and are usually ready with an account about their shaman sources. While agnostic about his tribal capture story, the authors write that Córdoba's extensive knowledge was certainly acquired from the native tribes of the region. They refer to him as "Don Manuel Córdova-Ríos, a vegetalista of great reputation for his knowledge of medicinal plants and for his success as a healer."

About Córdova as a healer and his "tale of kidnapping and apprenticeship with an Amerindian community", Prof. Smith reviews much of the literature mentioned here, and others, as well as local opinion. She agrees to his strong bone fides as a healer and vegetalista. Her article seeks, however, to situate his story within her critical schema of the commercial development of the Peruvian Amazon. In doing so she states, "I am suggesting that Córdoba's initiation story is incomplete but not false. His kidnapping and apprenticeship may very well have been experiences from the non-ordinary reality of an ayawaskha session."

== Ino Moxo: black jaguar ==
Manuel Córdova-Ríos acquired the name Ino Moxo, a word of the Amazon region which means: jaguar ino, and black moxo. A memorable event occurred a year before he began searching for rubber trees near Iberia. During a trip north to the Río Putumayo, the young Manuel when alone had come upon a black jaguar in the forest. During several fleeting moments of a vital and gripping intensity they had exchanged looks. Jaguars thereafter held a fascination for him, e.g., in his visions. Later he was captured and taken to the Huni Kui village, whose tribal stories and rituals would feature the jaguar.

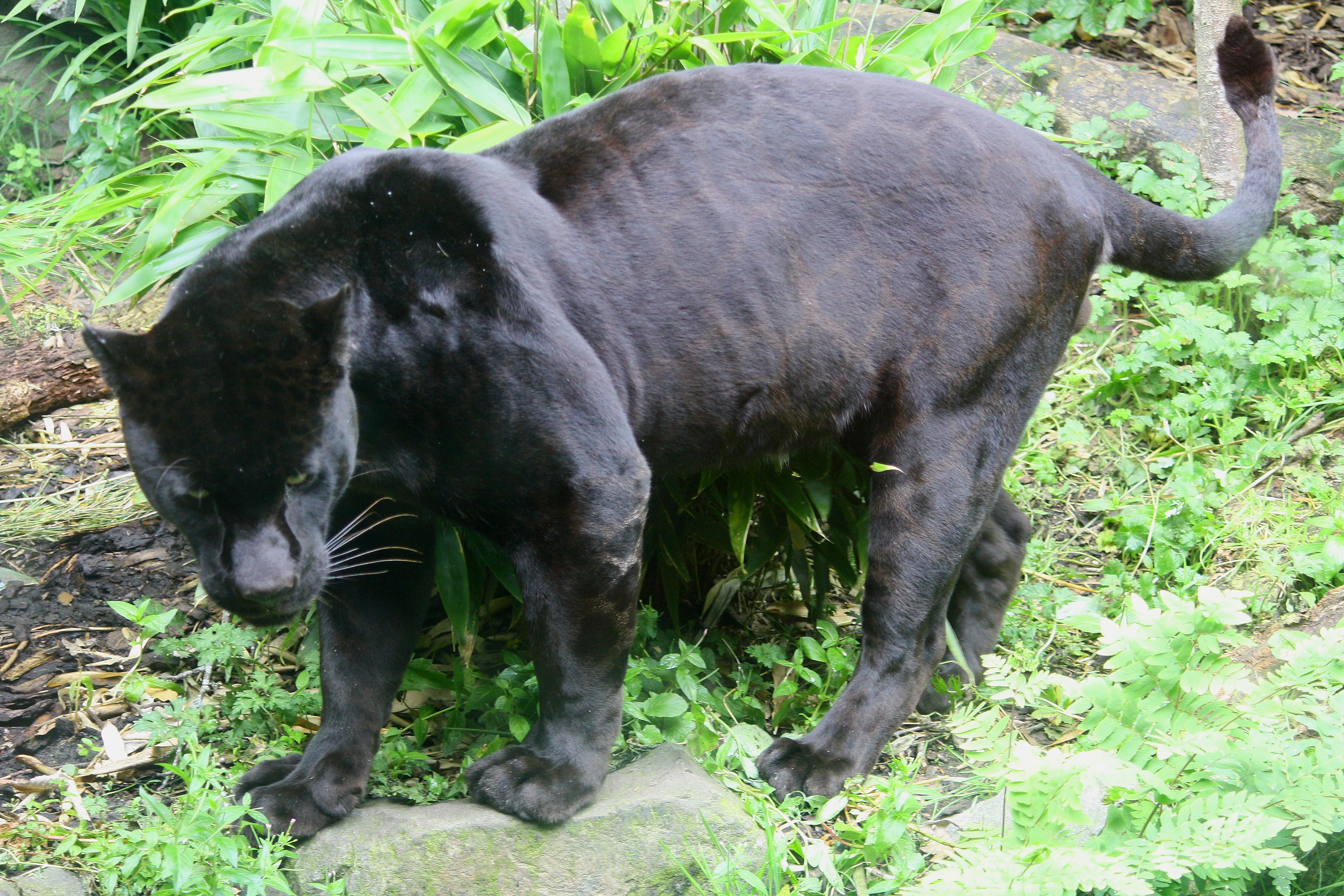
A melanistic Panthera onca is a color morph, occurring at about 6% frequency in jaguar populations of South America.

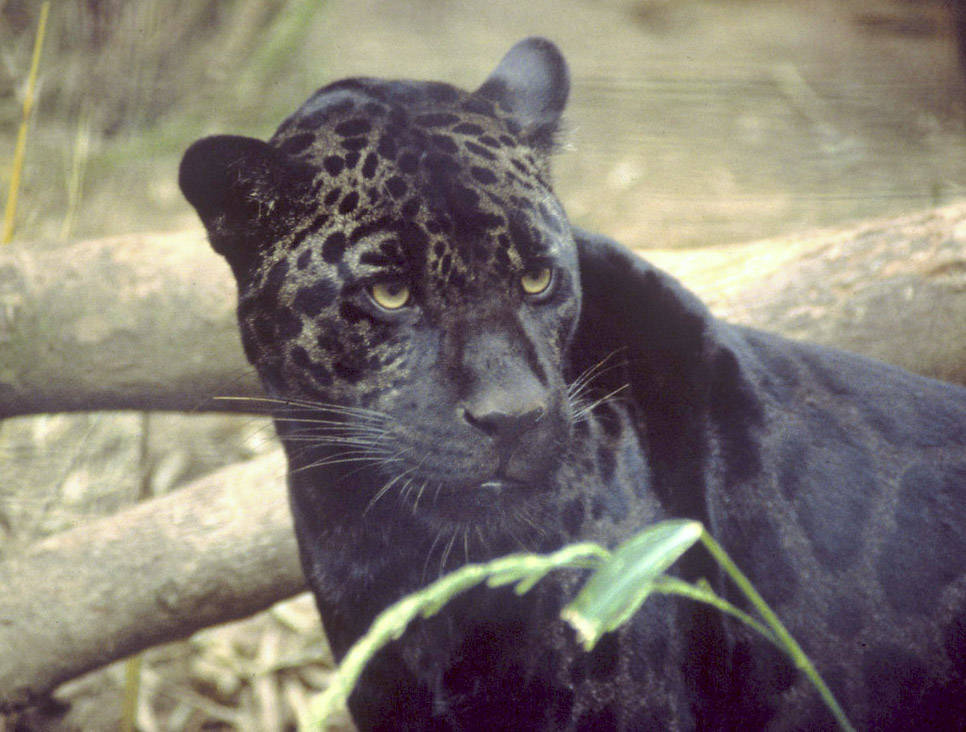
Black Jaguar of Panthera onca

At a time when the Huni Kui chief Xumu was declining in physical strength, there was an ayahuasca session in a forest clearing. A group of hunters took the drink, which then took its effect. Thereafter, in a parade of animals accompanied by the chanting of the hunters, the first animals to appear were large jungle cats. There came a "tawny puma... spotted ocelot, then a giant rosetta-spotted jaguar". Though of tremendous strength this animal shuffled along before the onlooking men. But the large cat's peaceful attitude ended abruptly. "An instant change of demeanor to vicious alertness caused a tremor through the circle of phantom-viewers." It was a terrifying sight. This vision sparked in the memory of Córdova his prior solitary encounter "face to face on a forest path with the rare black jaguar". He remembered clearly the ino moxo. "This mighty animal now intruded on our visions and a shudder passed through us all." Later, a "calabash of thick fruit gruel" made the rounds of the group.

"Everyone seemed aware of the source of the black jaguar sequence of visions. It left a strong impression on them and resulted in my being given the name Ino Moxo, Black Panther."

A slightly different version was later told. When the shared vision of the rosette-spotted jaguar worked to spark Córdova's own memory, he began a chant, "in the Huni Kui language, "Ino, Ino Mosho" (Black Jaguar) and the mighty black beast then intruded into the joint dreams of our group".

The novelist César Calvo Soriano narrates a different story altogether. He attaches the name change to an event orchestrated by chief Ximu [Xumu, Shumu], probably shortly after the arrival of the young Manuel Córdova in the Huni Kui village.

"The childhood of the kidnapped boy passed in a long celebration, a noisy ceremony of potions and fierce nostalgias, in the climax of which he was rebaptized. He stretched his arms, and from the high bush his new life rained down. 'Ino Moxo,' said the branches above, struck by a heavy downpour. 'Ino Moxo,' as a talisman made of roots and darkness. Ino Moxo: Black Panther."

After his return to Iquitos, Córdova led ayahuasca sessions for a Lamisto tribe upriver in Chazúta. Then the fierce black jaguar of his youthful encounter appeared again, in the shared fantasy of the Lamisto group; the vision became a local legend. Córdova settled down, making his home in the forest. Then, by using a native technique of putting 'stingers' in the footprints of jaguars, he caused the jungle near his home to become free of roaming jaguars, who had been stealing his chickens and pigs. In a different setting, he correctly predicted a fatal jaguar attack. As a cumulative result, he acquired a reputation for possessing control over the wild jaguars of the Amazon, Córdova informs us.

== Life in the Peruvian Amazon ==
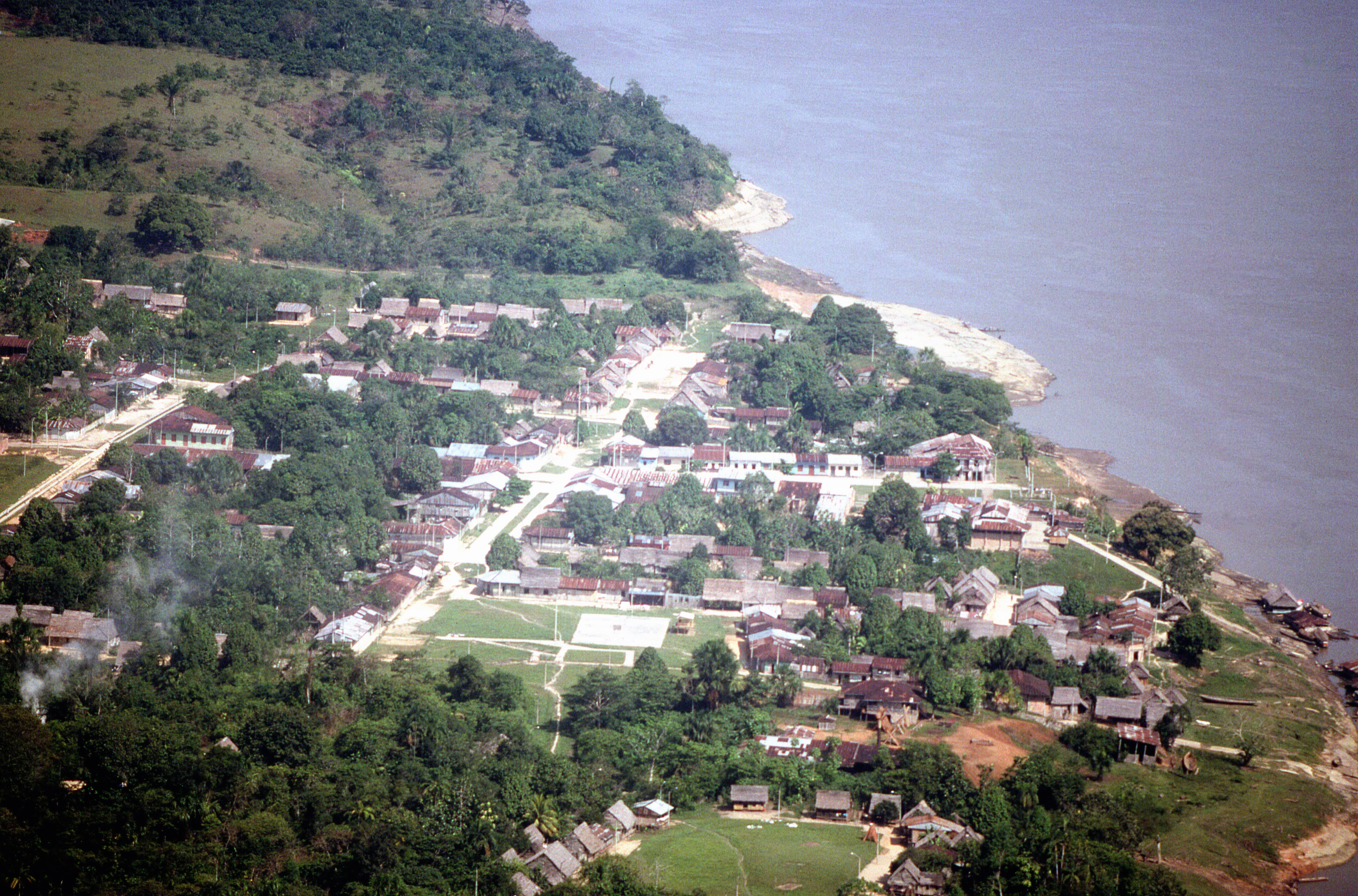
NE Iquitos, 1987. Features of the rural Amazon with urban settlement.

Following his return to his native city of Iquitos from the remote Huni Kui village of Xanadá, Córdova immediately discovered that his family had been struck by the plague, in which his mother died. Córdova then found work in the neighboring forests and rivers of the Peruvian Amazon, e.g., a return to being a rubber tapper, as a guide for timber surveyors, as a rural farmer, and locating plants for a pharmaceutical company. He married and started a family. In addition to his regular work, Córdova had begun to find cures for the sick when the situation arose, especially among the rugged and isolated people of the Amazon forest. He appreciated the great value of his learning in the healing arts received from Xumu, chief of the Huni Kui. His early practice of providing herbal remedies was occasional, but following many successful treatments, popular demand for his services increased. By then he and his family had returned to the urban life of Iquitos.

=== Forest guide and farmer ===
Although now moving about in western clothes, Córdova was nonetheless often able to establish rapport with tribal people of the forest. He understood several languages native to the upper Amazon. In addition to talking and listening, he also could share an intuitive familiarity, a fascination and an appreciation of the incredible forest. As an herbalist he knew directly the touch and smell of its flora and by hunting the tracks made by the fauna. He described one episode where a native man led Córdova away from a well-traveled river up a creek in order to reach his remote village and his shy, isolated people. Córdova's ability to paddle well in their tiny canoe and his comments "on the plants, birds, animals, on the sounds, smells, signs" of the forest led his companion to regard Córdova "as an equal. He would not have to apologize to his tribesmen for bringing me into their territory." Córdova told also about the time he journeyed to discuss with a "superstitious and clannish people" their on-site employment for the commercial collection of medical plants. For two days he was taken by mule trails to his guide's remote mountain village near the Andes, the two talking in a "brand of Quechua". His guide, having grown familiar with Córdova, felt no discomfort in presenting him to the reserved villagers.

Because of a temporary rise in rubber prices due to the World War (1914–18), Córdova was able to find work locating wild rubber trees for tapping. During these years, Córdova continued his interest in medicinal plants; he increased his knowledge by sharing with local practitioners and tribes. Eventually he entered into contract with an agent of pharmaceutical companies to act as an herbalist, to find plants of the Amazon region noted for their curative properties. In the meantime, he and his wife acquired 'squatter rights' on a river 'island' and Córdova started farming the land, growing corn and raising livestock. He hunted to supplement their diet. It was a few decades afterwards, when he and his maturing family lived in the Amazon city of Iquitos, that he served as guide for a timber company, e.g., in a region near the Andes called the eyebrows of the mountain [Sp: las cejas de la montaña]. An arboreal survey was being created, with information about river access. There began his work with an American forester, Bruce Lamb, who would become his lifelong friend and colleague. Lamb wrote the books and articles.

=== Tribes in transition ===
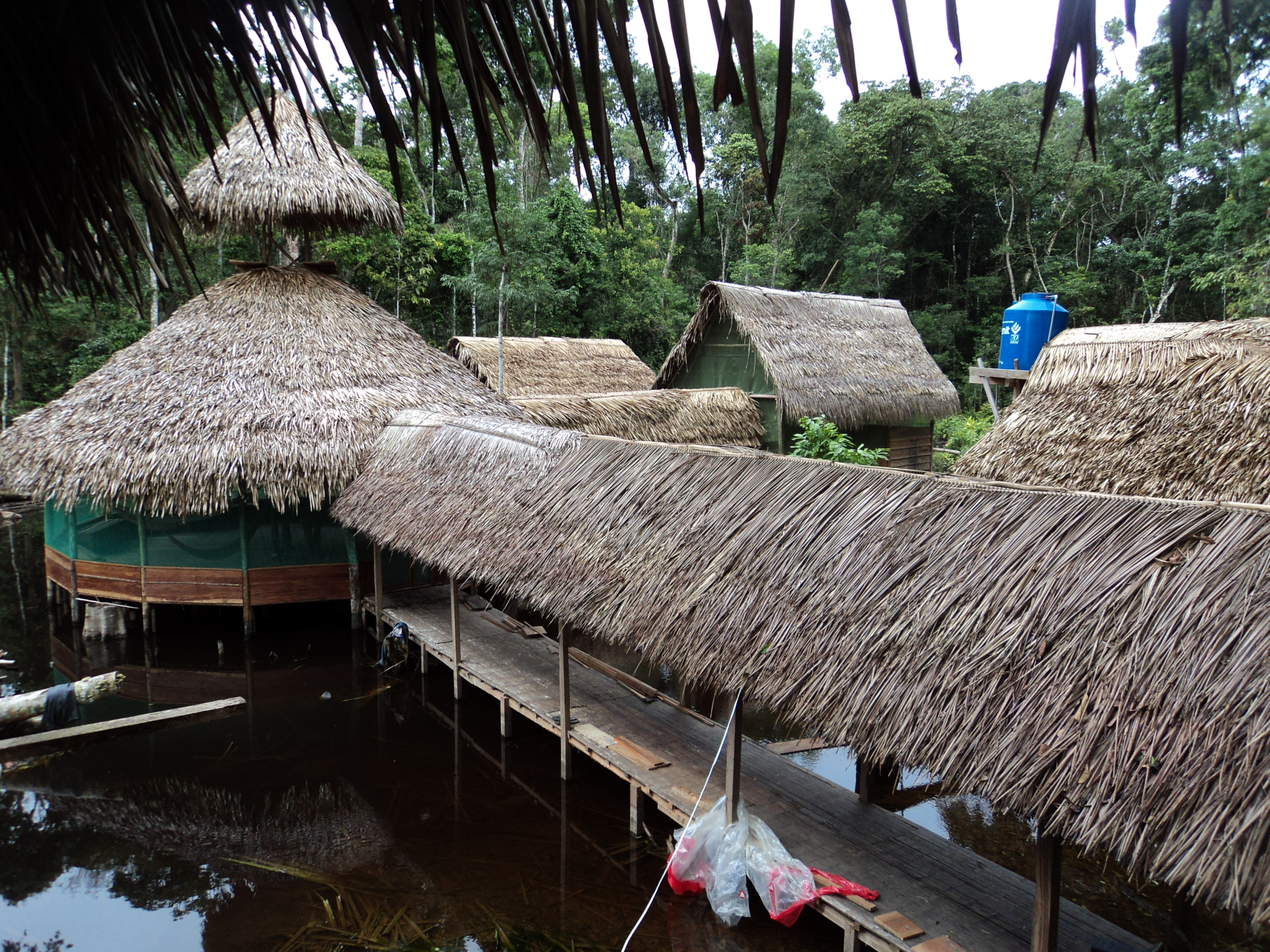
A Tapiche village

Later when elderly, Córdova reflected on his Amazon home in a wider context: the social disruption (superficially shown in mixed attire), difficult economic adjustments, territorial dispersal of 'refugees', and suffering among the tribes, all of which resulted in the wake of the modern advance in the Amazon of world commerce and culture. The rubber boom at the turn of the 19th century was a case in point. His own capture by the Huni Kui had happened as a result of one of the many cross-cultural dislocations. Of the collateral dystopias created by such advance, Córdova described one particular negative aspect, the seemingly contagious violence:

"The tribal lives of the forest-dwelling Indians of the Amazon were subject to devastating pressures by the invading rubber exploiters seeking riches... . Hostile tribes were forced into conflict by the invasion as [one tribe] sought to escape and establish new hunting territories in country already occupied by [an]other tribe."

While the youthful Córdova lived with the Huni Kui by the headwaters of the Río Purús, a thousand kilometers to the north on the Putumayo the international rubber trade disgracefully created hell. Generally in the Amazon region, episodes of social injustice and culture clash persisted. Especially since 1900, the Peruvian Amazon has been in a state of continual transformation, for better or for worse. Among intrusions during the last five centuries: the military, missions, and traders; the government, settlers, and botanists; rubber, lumber, and oil; ranching, air travel, and urban retail; transistor radios, tourism, and mobile phones.

These modernizing changes in the Amazon were accompanied by an increase in intermarriage and interracial marriage, which had commenced four centuries earlier. These novel unions occurred with members of different tribes, with Europeans, and with Africans. The multitribal or mestizo children and descendants often belonged exclusively to neither the father's nor the mother's culture. A person who lived in the river and forest communities without tribal affiliation became described as a "ribereño", which might include Córdova.

=== Marriage and family ===
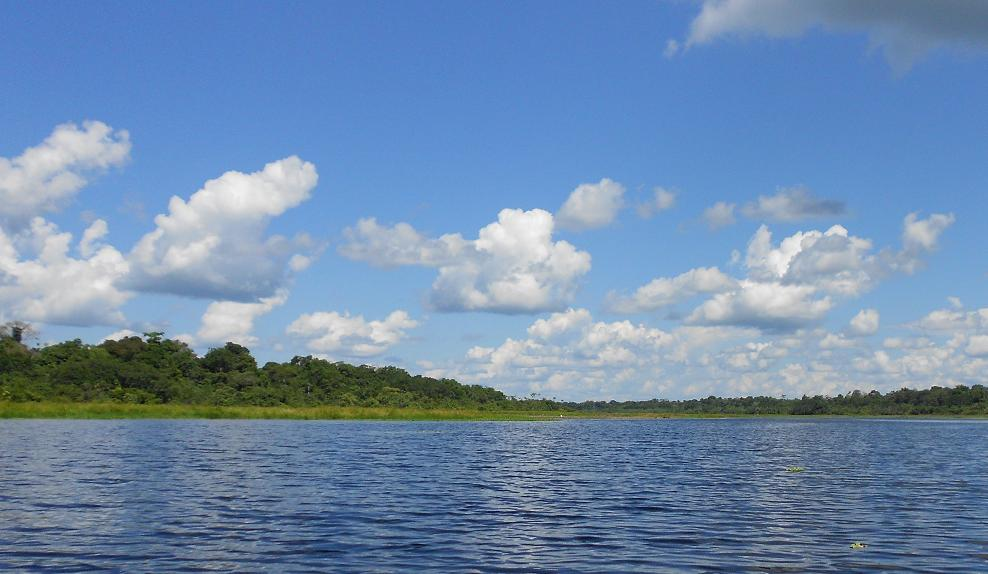
Río Tapiche in Loreto Region of Peru

Córdova had noticed a young student, Nieves Ochoa, at the Catholic Mission and Convent School for Girls located by the river settlement of Requena on the lower Ucayali at the mouth of the Río Tapiche. He arranged with her to meet secretly several times. Then, as the narration explains, "I stole her from the Padres and took her with me to the upper Tapiche." After the birth of two daughters (for each occasion he had "prepared herbal baths and extracts for Nieves to drink"), the couple was married by Padre Augustín Lopez of the convent school, who also baptized their children.

From the Río Tapiche Nieves and Manuel then moved to Áquano Isla on the Río Ucayali. They constructed a rustic home and began to work as an independent farming family, obtaining the "squatter's rights" of another. Although rewarded by their efforts, the river's changing currents made the Isla unstable. Later, on the long-term advice of the Padre, they moved to the large city of Iquitos. There Córdova eventually became a full-time vegetalista or, what has been called an urban shaman, a curandero. Nieves Ochoa assisted in his work, and came to share in his visions. They enjoyed a large family: five sons and five daughters, and with time 50 grandchildren.

=== Coliseo de Gallos ===
Suffering from increasing river flooding on the Áquano Isla farm, the Córdova family relocated to the city of Iquitos. He contacted a boyhood friend from school, who needed someone to manage an ongoing business in Iquitos, and they formed a partnership. The business involved holding public events which featured fighting cocks. Córdova worked on assembling the best string of such fowl. The concession stand he left to his wife and children. His fighting cocks became famous and were often victorious. Betting was a major means of revenue, both the house percentage and his own wagers, along with spectator tickets, competitor entry fees, and the concessions. He later bought out his partner. When for extraneous reasons Córdova later fled to Manaus where he remained for several years, his two older sons were able to successfully run the business. The arena was named the Córdova Coliseo de Gallos. On his return from Manaus, the family decided to sell the company.

=== Herbalist and healer ===
As mentioned, Córdova continued to utilize the training in healing arts taught him by chief Xumu of the Huni Kui. Episodes involving his individual patients are narrated intermittently throughout the Río Tigre book, especially in the chapter "Man of Medicine". He began with his own family. Córdova relates that he "prepared herbal baths and extracts for Nieves to drink before and after the birth of our children". Also he made an herbal drink to cure his second daughter of a youthful, diabetic-like condition. Much later he prepared plant extracts to serve as a contraceptive for one of his five daughters.

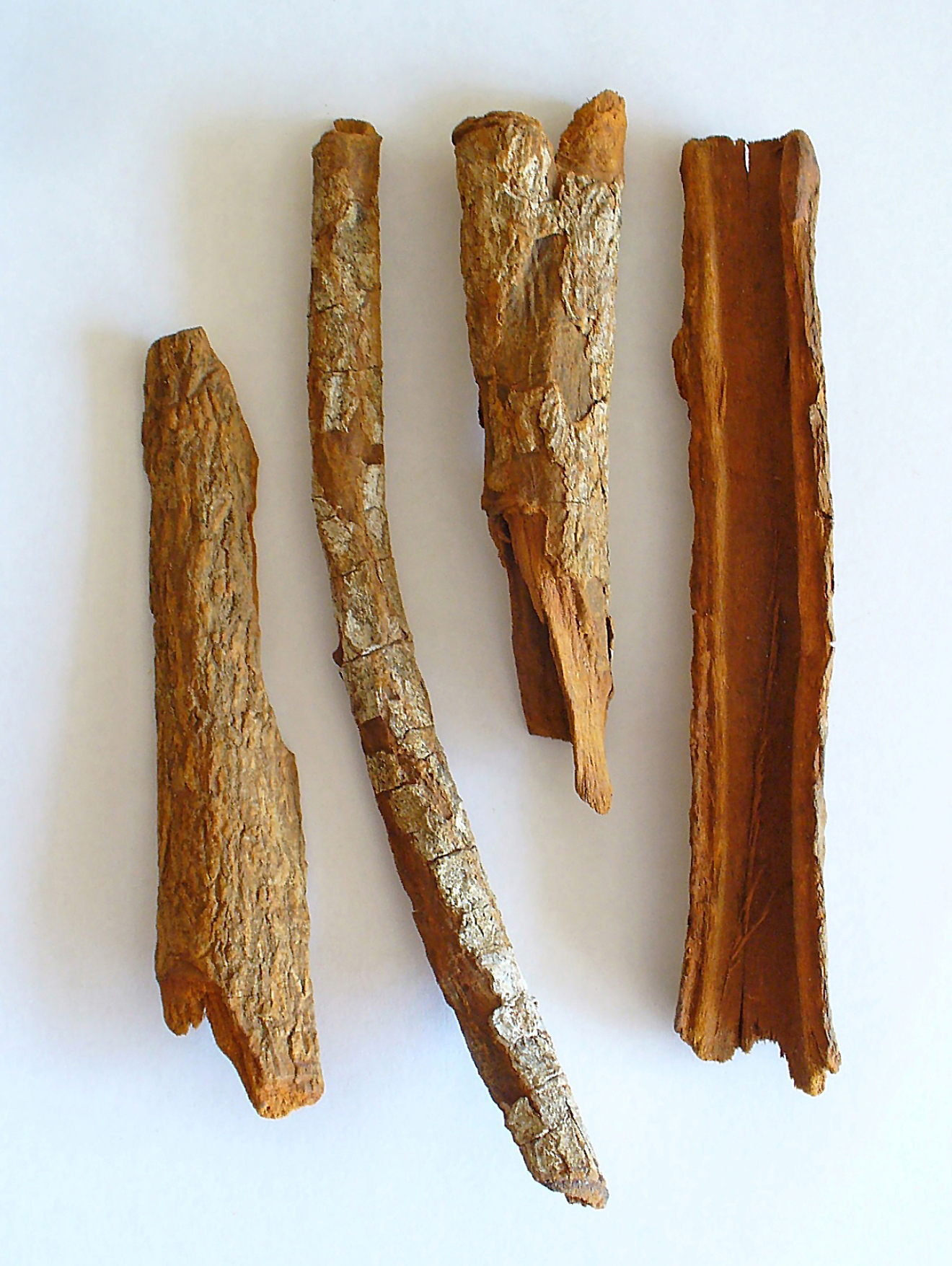
Cinchona tree's bark: a remedy.

His early patients usually were poor mestizos and people of the forest tribes. While living on remote Áquino Isla, he attended a friend with a severe skin rash erupting all over his body that was thought to be leprosy but which Córdova diagnosed as pellagra (due to a poor diet), and a woman with a continuing flow of blood after childbirth. Both cures were effected by herbal extracts. "When it became known by word of mouth that I could cure people they came from far and near for help." Mentioned are other Amazon treatments for: alcoholism (a cure learned from chief Huanichi of the Capanahua), diabetes, and epilepsy. Later in Iquitos he cured a young girl with a lung infection doctors thought tubercular, but Córdova tracked it to a festering wound in her foot that had superficially healed over, but whose infection had migrated to her lungs. His reputation grew. A judge called Córdova about his seriously ill daughter for whom doctors "could do nothing more"; after an interview and exam, and by using ayahuasca, he found that her liver was the problem's source and prepared several plant extracts: first to "detoxify" her from prior "improper medication", and then to treat her liver.

While resident in the Brazilian city of Manaus he continued to practice the healing arts. After returning to Peru, at a jungle curare camp he had established, Córdova treated an associate's wife who for many years suffered from epileptic seizures; he made her a preparation containing fine powder from pedernal (flint) rock, which may contain lithium, a remedy chief Huanichi had taught him. Later by use of the pedernal powder and a tree bark, Córdova helped several suicide-prone patients with manic depression. At Chazúta the local tribe, who considered illness the work of evil spirits, requested him to attend to a dying man, who Córdova found to be suffering instead from malaria and intestinal parasites; his herbal remedies improved his condition. By Río Napo Córdova cured himself of uta a local skin disease disfiguring to nose and ears which he had contracted from a red fly's bite. An herbal remedy he prepared for "sore throat and head cold" might function as an aphrodisiac if taken in increased amounts, which inadvertently happened.

A case involving an Iquitos policeman had puzzled doctors who hinted at a surgical solution; after receiving a mixture of tree leaves and tree bark, the man passed an "intestinal tapeworm" and was restored to health. A case that stumped doctors in Lima was later diagnosed by Córdova as erysipelas, cured with a drink made from tree barks and baths. The chapter "Man of Medicine" contains descriptions of other cases, including those involving: diabetes, lameness, ulcers, lumbago, kidney stones, asthma, and leukemia (a case whose cure the previous doctors considered "miraculous, unbelievable"). In many cases Córdova found a way to heal where earlier medical doctors had not been as fortunate. A remedy he derived from Amazon vegetalismo, some said, was a cure for cancer. Córdova mentions three cases he treated which had been doctor-diagnosed as cancer: two satisfactory; in the third the patient obtained relief from suffering yet died in his sleep.

According to a Lima newspaper, he was seeing about 500 people a month. Lamb described Córdova as a person who "stood out in a group. Sitting in repose, smoking his ever-present pipe and conversing quietly, he gave the impression of a benign presence." His patients came from stations high and low. He treated many of the poor of Iquitos, whom he charged very little for his services. "I make people well more for personal satisfaction than for personal gain." As his chronicler Lamb wrote, "Córdova himself expressed a certain sense of awe at his ability to heal."

=== Exile to Brazil: Manaus ===
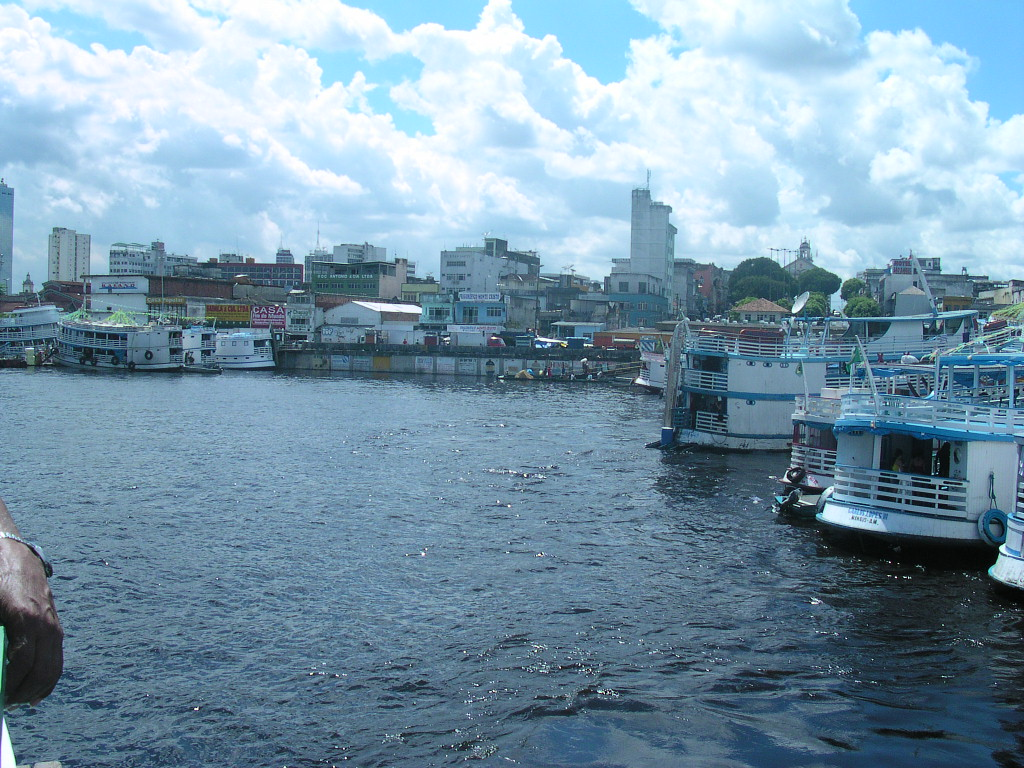
Shoreline & boats, Manaus (2006)

As a result of successful outcomes due to his herbal treatment of those suffering from ill health, Córdoba had established himself as a vegetalista in Iquitos – a good reputation he continued to earn in the region, and so became a popular healer. Yet a latent rivalry between the university-trained medical profession and the local curanderos in the Peruvian Amazon unfortunately, among a few, came to focus on him. Unexpectedly, he was accused of practicing medicine without a license and formally charged. It was the provincial court's vocál, whom Córdoba considered to be a corrupt official, who told him he would be prosecuted. This official then went on to call Córdoba a "fraud" who was "exploiting the people". To this face-to-face insult, Córdoba "reacted spontaneously and violently" giving the vocál "the full impact of a clenched fist on the side of his jaw", which felled him.

As a result, Córdoba was advised to leave the jurisdiction for the time being. He fled across the border to Brazil, where he then resided for several years. In the Amazon River city of Manaus (Manáos), recently accustomed to wealth made from the rubber trade, he became acquainted with men in business and the professions who were masons. Years earlier Córdoba had joined the masons in Cruzeiro do Sul on the Río Juruá. In Manaus he found that his idle membership now helped him make contacts that would increase his commercial opportunities, e.g., here he met Douglas Allen, the president for the Astoria Company of New York then visiting Brazil. He also enjoyed the friendship of medical doctors, Limirio da Costa and Mitrides de Lima Correa, with whom he traded his information on jungle plants and who in return enriched his understanding, e.g., of anatomy and physiology. Córdova's access to professional and book learning enabled him to establish for himself a more formal medical knowledge, and consequently greater scope and depth regarding his vegetalista point of view.

=== Specimens for Nueva York ===
After World War II, while Córdova was living in Manaus, his knowledge of the medicinal properties of Amazon plants attracted the attention of the Astoria Company of New York City, which dealt primarily in lumber. This enterprise considered that it could produce and distribute "commercial medical products" made of plant extracts, or perhaps facilitate transfer of proprietary information, to the pharmaceutical industry in the USA. Also university medical schools might be interested. It had set up Compania Astoria Peruana and had started a lumber office in Iquitos under José O'Neil, who later befriended Córdova. Thus he became employed by Astoria to collect the Amazon plants he knew and to provide them with proper annotation, for shipment to Nueva York.

Córdova spent several years gathering such herbal samples, whole or cuttings; the company provided him with a metal boat with an outboard motor. Later he composed an index with medicinal commentary. When eventually completed, his annotated collection of plants was shipped to Astoria Company in New York City. Unfortunately, Córdova's follow-up inquiries to the company about the fate of his work received no response. Years later an investigation by author Bruce Lamb in New York City found that Córdova's work had been received, but negligence by the Astoria employee in charge had led to its dissipation. A majority of the annotated plant specimens had been removed, probably by unidentified commercial interests, but no records were kept. Nonetheless, Córdova told Lamb that, considering his entire relationship with the company, "my feeling is more of gratitude than rancor".

=== Curare extract for export ===
Córdoba continued his interest in Amazon flora. One plant known as ampihuasca would especially occupy his attention. Its extract was quite deleterious, indeed it could prove fatal, yet medical science had found beneficial applications for it. The extract, named curare, when injected into the body can cause a temporary paralysis of skeletal muscles; it functions as an adjunct "in anesthesia for the production of muscle relaxation in various surgical procedures". Thus, in surgery muscles treated with a curare "syrup" in order to subdue their movement might allow a physician, e.g., to make delicate incisions on a stationary target.

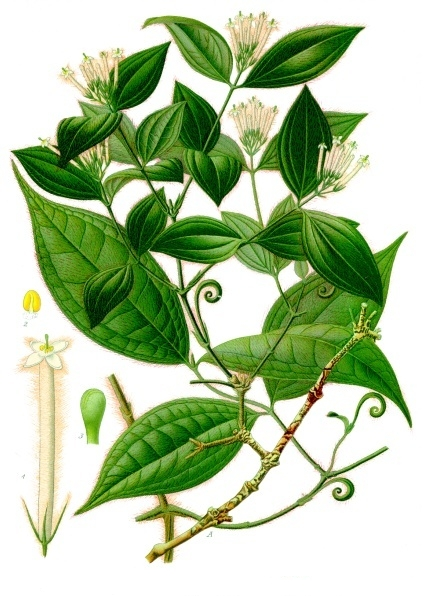
Strychnos toxifera (curare source), by Koehler 1887.

Curare is known by many tribes across the Amazon forest, where it has served as a poison. Over a low fire the purified extract in time became a thickened liquid; it was then brushed onto arrow heads and dart points for use in hunting. Curare acts quickly as a paralysing poison when it directly enters the bloodstream. It is apparently safe to be taken orally, so that "one can drink the poison without being harmed". Hence wild birds and animals caught by using curare are safe to eat. Years earlier Córdova had learned how to make it.

Córdova was taught the art of the curare extract by Izidoro, who called it "winged death". Izidoro was chief of the Jaguar clan of the Tikuna tribe. He and Córdova agreed to share their herbal knowledge, he about curare, Córdoba about ayahuasca. Regarding curare, it took several days to collect the source ampihuasca, "a large woody vine that hangs down from the tree tops". Izidoro would climb up to a hundred feet to cut this four-inch thick vine, each plant being carefully scrutinized and its name voiced. Other ingredients for the brew were also taken, e.g., hot peppers, tobacco leaves, and scorpions. The vine was mashed and put with water in a pot, kept at a low simmer for several days, during which the liquid was filtered and skimmed. Incantations were required to guide the process. Its fumes were to be avoided. The brew became complete when an iridescent film formed on its surface.

During the 20th century, medical use of the plant extract curare had continued to increase, causing a noticeable rise in its commercial market. The Astoria Company's next assignment for Córdova was curare. He was particularly qualified to find the source plants and produce an extract of fine quality. He chose the foothills of the Andes, a region known as cejas de la montaña (eyebrows of the mountain). By this time he sometimes flew by airplane to remote sites. An associate introduced him to a local Lamisto tribe. Here his ability to speak Quechua was key in recruiting workers. A curare camp was soon functioning, with well-ventilated fireplaces carved out from a stream bank of clay. Careful instructions were given as to the vine: its color, age, and freshness. Because scorpions were regularly found hiding in holes of the vine, the men called it madre de alacrán (mother of scorpions). An ASAP order for 200 kilograms was shipped in about three weeks. In reply the quality of this curare was rated excellent and a new order for 500 kilos made. Production continued on and off, fitting the seasonal availability of the Lamisto workers; Chazutinos were also involved. Eventually a synthetic substitute was developed which, when made commercially available, began to close the market for the plant product. "The last batch of curare extract that I made was finished in November 1965".

=== Later recognition ===
His abilities as a healer had been demonstrated in the large number of people who had received successful cures, and in the subsequent steady demand for his medical services. Public recognition accumulated gradually. Eventually his patients included members of the elite, i.e., generals, admirals, a judge, a surgeon, an ambassador, and a former President of Peru. He was offered the position of Director of Medical Services by PetrolPeru, the state oil company, which he declined. Similarly declined: Professor of Medical Botany at the University of San Marcos in Lima. During what were Córdova's last years, a visitor to his home in Iquitos found him surprisingly fit in appearance, writing later that "he looked sixty, except for cataract-clouded eyes". On his 91st birthday he passed on.

== Practice as a vegetalista ==
Córdova in the Rio Tigre book mentions many times his sense of obligation, however difficult, to train an apprentice, to pass on to another the knowledge of medicinal plants he had received from chief Xumu of the Huni Kui. In a sense, the book's information about herbs and stories about his experience as a vegetalista, as well as his views about health care and his practice insights into the healing arts, function as a testament to his training by chief Xumu. Many descriptions his treatments and cures are referenced in the above section: "Herbalist and healer". During the period when the elder Córdova practiced his "Amazon medicine", several photographs of him were taken and later published (though of poor-resolution): one in the Rio Tigre book, taken in a forest hut with a village shaman; and two in César Calvo's 'novel': a serious portrait, and a smiling Córdova with pipe.

=== Botanico's healing arts ===
"I could never turn suffering people away when I had it in my power to help." This was Córdova's stated understanding both of his desire to heal and of his obligation to aid others with his medicinal skill. Although opinionated about healthy living, Córdova's medical practice usually went beyond the psycho-somatic aspect of an illness. His patients were provided with herbal regimens and other cures that addressed their physical complaints. Yet he also mentioned an ability in what appears to be psychological transference, which worked ancillary to his somatic remedies effected by use of plant extracts. Hence Córdova could be very persuasive, possessing the gravitas to inspire another's confidence in him as a healer.

Many folk healers of the Amazon concentrate more on the psycho-somatic approach and, accordingly, might radiate "an aura of omnipotence" about their healing prowess. Although fortunate in his charisma as a folk healer, Córdova also had learned from his Amazon teachers a profound knowledge about which medicinal plant worked to cure a particular physical ailment. The Huni Kui were especially knowledgeable about herbal remedies. A French Catholic missionary priest Contant Tastevin, who had become familiar with the Huni Kui, wrote in a 1926 article: "They know all the remedies of the forest. Every leaf, stem and vine they know and use as remedies." He then listed as examples ten plants, each the Huni Kui used to cure a specific ailment. Among Amazon tribes the elder Córdova worked with and knew, he realized that his "former captors" the Huni Kui were perhaps the best herbalists. They "possess the complete knowledge of the forest plants", including the use of ayahuasca.

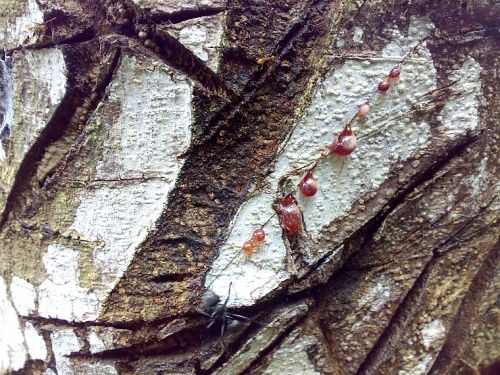
Sangre de Grado, medicinal plant

Córdova's basic approach was to listen carefully to the patient. They were asked to describe the ailment, including its likely first cause: what they were doing differently about the time it started. He would then examine the patient's general health and physical condition, and location of the illness. Thereafter, often in the evening, when quiet and composed, Córdova would visualize the patient's body as a whole, and identify the malfunctioning organ. In his youth he took ayahuasca to stimulate his perceptions and visualizations. Later in life, however, his prescriptive sense had developed with experience, and he no longer made and drank an ayahuasca brew. Once having grasped the patient's condition, an herbal cure would suggest itself to him. Then he carefully prepared the medicine from plants at hand, or from those specially gathered, and either applied it himself or instructed the patient in its use. Afterwards he would monitor the course of the herbal treatment along with the patient's diet.

As a 'modern' vegetalista Córdova understood that the healing properties possessed by medicinal plants might be explained by a scientific process similar to molecular biology. Yet he favored remedies made organically from plants, voicing opposition to use of "synthetic medicines", especially in "massive doses". Some such synthetic drugs could be poisonous to the natural body. In event of such a case, Córdova's first step might be to detoxify the patient.

Because some of his successful treatments followed failure by doctors trained in medical school, some patients referred to their cure as "miraculous". Córdova, however, would credit his method of approach, the plant remedy, and his follow through. His methodology consisted of: careful patient interviews, particularly about the origin of the symptoms, and physical examinations; his reflective study of the case to arrive at a proper diagnosis; purity and dedication in preparation of plant extracts; and attentive monitoring of the patient's response to administration of the herbal remedy. Key to his beneficial results was, he said, his early training received from the Huni Kui shaman-chief Xumu Nawa.

=== View of tribal spiritualities ===
Córdova strongly disapproved of tribal sorcery and witchcraft, i.e., working to place a curse on another person and thereby cause harm. More than once he forcefully declared how such malfeasant designs often backfire, evoking a murderous response from those who felt injured or victimized by such cursing, or merely threatened. As a herbal healer Córdova was a pragmatist, who wanted to cure the people who came to him. He knew that some people and some tribes understood illness as the work of demons. To be effective in such cases, Córdova knew that a curandero (healer) must demonstrate that the putative demon has been removed. Hence, as part of the treatment, the sick person might be shown a thorn sucked from the afflicted body organ, which supposedly completed the 'magic' cure. Such an accommodating attitude also allowed Córdoba the ability to converse with different curacas of the tropical forest and later with folk healers in town.

His disapproval of popular sorcery did not mean that Córdova also rejected the healing practices of the forest and corollary tribal beliefs. Especially so regarding ayahuasca: its use could assist in finding herbal cures for people, and for other beneficial purposes. Córdova's long experience in jungle medicine had demonstrated to his satisfaction that some ayahuasquero procedures regularly worked to heal the sick. For that reason he esteemed and respected such ayahuasca practice when properly conducted.

Accordingly, after his return to Peruvian life from the Huni Kui village, Córdova, when in the forest on other business, had noticed the presence of the ayahuasca vines. He eventually began to collect the several ingredients to brew ayahuasca, which he then carefully prepared. Thereafter, he conducted group ayahuasca sessions with the Chazúta, which energized and enlightened the tribal members. At this and later sessions elsewhere, Córdova led the group by using his chants and songs, learned from chief Xumu.

Córdoba seemed more or less able to acknowledge, and thus straddle, two worlds: tribal tradition and urban modernity. Among the benefits an ayahuasquero could provide, according to Córdova, were: (1) guidance of the taker of the drink, and (2) use of other herbs of the forest to heal the sick. Ayahuasca itself, Córdova understood, was not a medicinal plant for use in healing. Its use was for listening and seeing visions. "Ayahuasca, it tells you how, but by itself it cures nothing directly."

Although Córdova became locally famous as a practicing master in the use of ayahuasca's powers to find the remedy for a cure, apparently he did not claim a complete explanatory understanding of the extraordinary experience, i.e., exactly how in theory ayahuasca worked. He might at times offer mystical suggestions about its uncanny ability to lead him to a diagnosis and herbal prescription for patients. He also suggested purely biological functions initiated by ayahuasca, obscure functions which are little understood by science. Other times, supernatural origins might be mentioned, e.g., that the animals taught the secrets of the forest to ancient tribal shamans. Contemporary urban vegetalistas are said to be a counterpart to tribal religious leaders of the Amazon. Following the teachings of chief Xumu of the Huni Kui, Córdova continued to sing traditional icaros to the plants while he prepared his extracts. He remained convinced that chanting the forest songs medically enhanced, in a mystic way, the herbal remedies he was preparing.

=== Ayahuasca: diagnosis, remedy ===
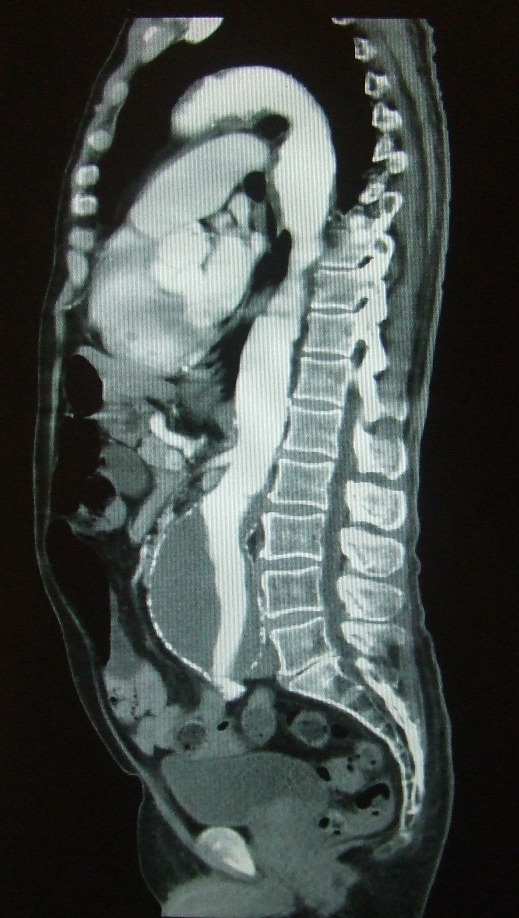
Medical imaging with modern technology: Bolus tracking re an AAA

As part of his practice as a curandero in the Peruvian Amazon, following the initial interview of a patient with a difficult illness, Córdova would retire in the late evening to brew and drink ayahuasca, often witnessed by his wife Nieves. These nocturnal reflections allowed him to arrive at a correct medical diagnosis of the particular illness and then to identify the right herbal remedy for its treatment. Chief Xumu of the Huni Kui had taught him the subtleties of this technique of using ayahuasca. After years of practicing as an herbalist, Córdova realized that he had acquired sufficient experience in this technique as to be able to make a diagnosis and find the remedy without taking ayahuasca again.

The intensive medical training provided by Xumu included his regular guidance of Córdova's awareness while he was under the influence of ayahuasca. Córdova estimates he received from Xumu such lessons using ayahuasca approximately five hundred times. During these vision sessions, Xumu and others instructed him in the specific healing properties of each individual Amazon plant while Córdova was observing the plant, its appearance and identifying characteristics—either as Córdova saw the physical plant in the forest, or as Córdova saw the plant in ayahuasca vision.

Xumu further instructed Córdova how to approach symptoms: the purpose being to carefully understand the patient's body as a unitary field with energy flows, which the illness or disease upsets by obstructing the flow or otherwise disrupting the balance of the whole. Hence Córdova always paid primary attention to the symptoms of an ailment, whether observed by him directly or as described to him by the patient. Córdova relates that this procedure is advanced by ayahuasca in that by its use the curandero is able to peer directly inside the body of the patient and appraise overall health, the condition of specific organs, and the unitary balance of the energy flows, in order to reach a diagnosis.

According to Córdova, once he had arrived at an understanding of the nature of the patient's illness, e.g., its source in a particular organ of the body, and so made his medical diagnosis, there then occurred within his mental vision a remarkable phenomenon: the spontaneous appearance of the medicinal plant associated with its remedy and cure. This experience is not further explained by Córdova. Based on his rigorous and intensive training under chief Xumu, lasting many years, it is possible that Córdova absorbed Xumu's knowledge through something like rote learning. The anthropologist Luis Eduardo Luna mentions that there is a special, mystical process for transmission of knowledge from Amazon shaman to apprentice. Luna also states that the physical shape of a medicinal plant may provide a clue in ascertaining its properties as a remedy relative to a specific ailment. Nonetheless, a vegetalista's frank explanation remains simply that the vine ayahuasca does directly inform the healer of what medicinal plant is the best remedy. If so, here would remain a mystery inherent in Córdova's practice of the healing arts, as it constitutes a key element in a necessary procedure (identifying the plant remedy), which continues to elude an explicit, adequate, and thorough explanation using principles of modern medical science.

=== Context of medical science ===
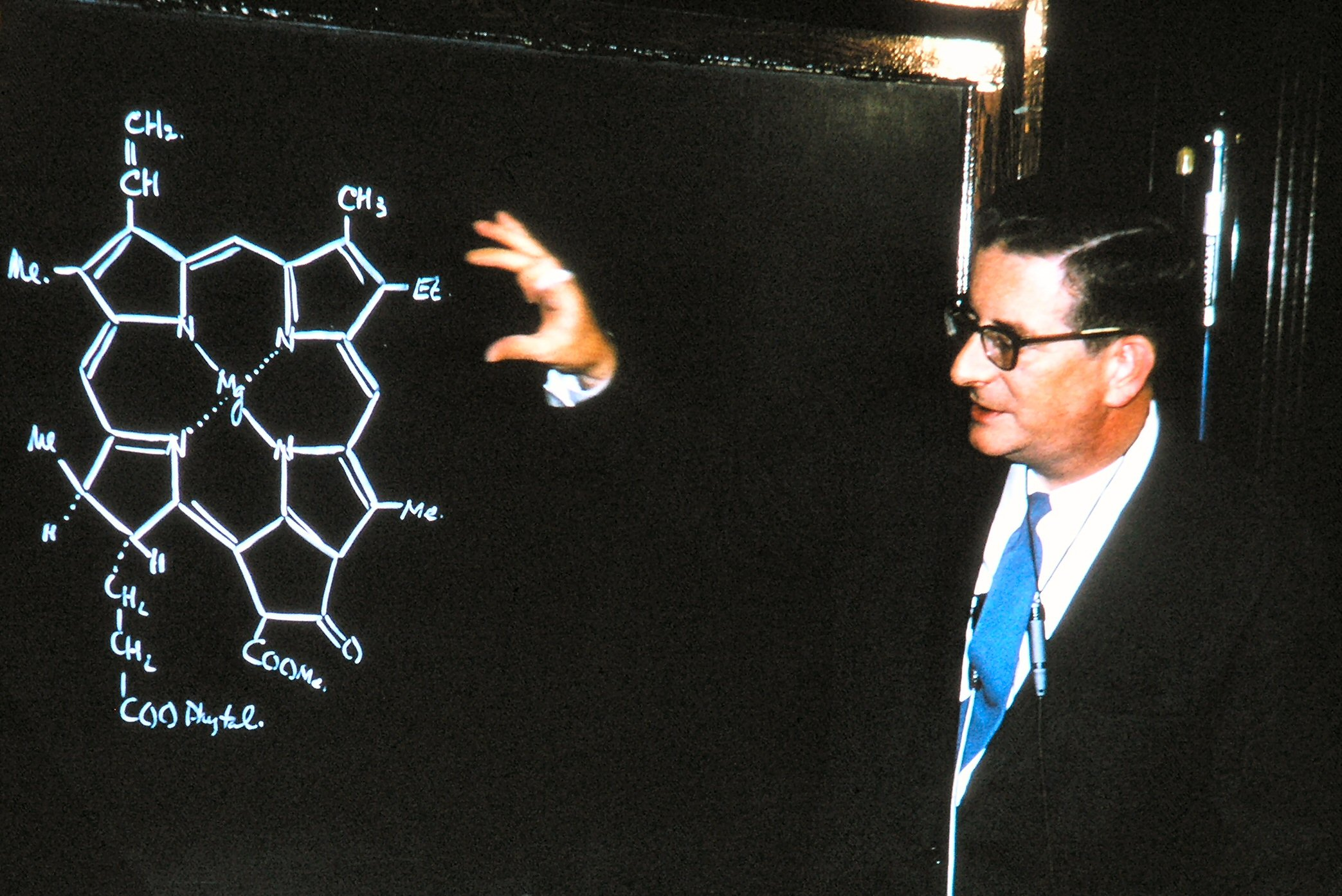
Quinine, synthesized by organic chemistry. Yet Córdova opposed use of "synthetic medicines".

The herbs and plant extracts customary to the traditional healing arts of the tribes who inhabit the Amazon forests have earned worldwide renown for their medical properties. Pharmaceutical companies have become familiar with the potential of "enormous value" both to science and to modern medical practice of these new "discoveries".

"South American jungle tribes were the first to use curare which is so important to modern surgical techniques. Many types of rauwolfia were employed by jungle shamans centuries before our medical men thought of tranquilizers. Quinine and all the other antimalarial drugs have their origin in the forests of the Amazon."

During Córdova's lifetime and continuing until today, there remain many medical plants whose beneficial properties are little known, or whose molecular biology in effecting a cure is little understood. The traffic across the frontier between western scientific medicine and the practice of traditional medical cures (of the Amazon, but also of China, and of India) has greatly increased in recent times. In this context Córdova was one of the many pioneers.

"There seems to be a lot in common between my method of healing and that developed in the Orient using natural plants for treatment of illness. I understand that Japanese practices lean heavily on traditional Chinese healing techniques. I have had contact with American botanists and pharmaceutical investigators also, but... nothing ever comes back in exchange."

Córdova's approach to medical practice involved the view that the body works as a whole, in which sickness disrupts the harmonious flow of energy which gives us health. Accordingly, in western medical science his methods would probably be termed "alternative". Although the vegetalista uses plants for their healing power, the plant is understood to contain both a physical and a spiritual dimension. Only the former is acknowledged as scientific by western medicine, the latter might even be considered quackery. A plant's spirit, according to the ayahuasquero, responds to sounds especially the singing of icaros. Hence, the medicinal plant, which firstly acts through its properties as understood by molecular biology, when viewed alternatively secondly acts also as a carrier which conveys the curandero's icaro of healing energy to the patient. Regarding the plants, Córdova asks, "What good do you think my remedies would be if I didn't sing to them?"

== Subject of novel, and poem ==
In addition to the novel, and the long poem (both discussed below), Córdova in Wizard of the Upper Amazon may have been an indirect cause of the 1985 film The Emerald Forest.

=== Las tres mitades de Ino Moxo ===
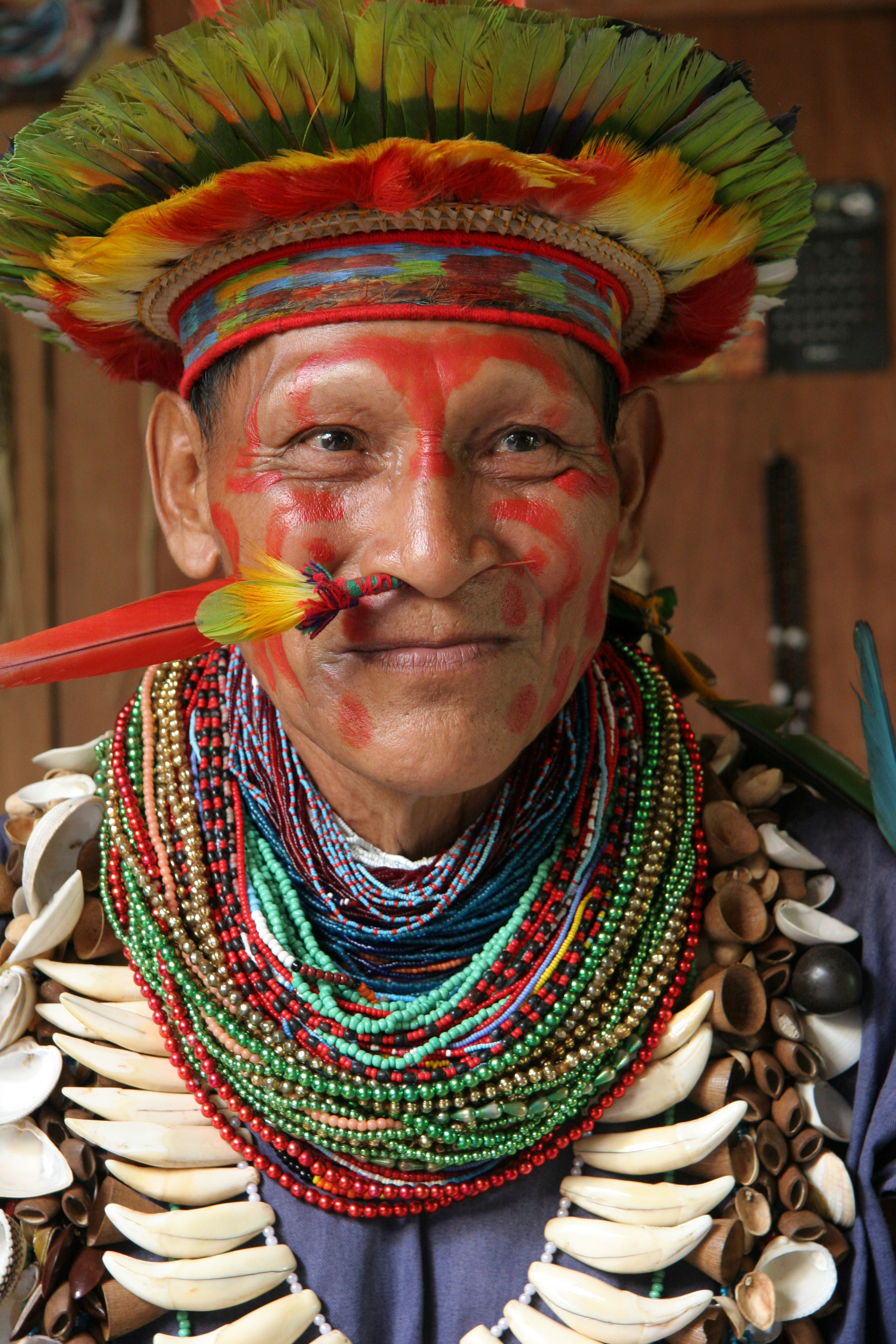
Amazon shaman, as one of Córdova's three-halves in Calvo's book

Manuel Córdova-Ríos (Ino Moxo) inspired a 1981 novel by the Peruvian poet and writer César Calvo Soriano, who was himself a native of the Peruvian Amazon. It was published in Iquitos. The Spanish novel's title in English translation is The Three-Halves of Ino Moxo.

The story told describes a pilgrimage to the shaman Ino Moxo, undertaken by author César Calvo and his fictional cousin César Soriano. Along the way appear associates Félix Insapillo and Iván. They first encounter several other shaman-curanderos of the region: Don Juan Testa, Don Hildebrando, Don Javier, and Juan González. The party continues their fictional journey to the remote refuge of an elderly Córdova (known here as Ino Moxo).

The novel appears based on very real people, yet they become transformed into literary characters who inhabit a poetic epic. Hence the work partakes somewhat of the new journalism or creative nonfiction. Although the book often reads like poetry, demonstrating at times an imaginative voyage through a shifting intersubjectivity, nonetheless mixed in are events from Peruvian history. The narrative is framed as factual. Over a dozen identified photographs are included, of local scenes and portraits of people, e.g., Córdova.

Ino Moxo, in interviews with the book's author, discusses matter-of-factly the sense of mystical surreality in the Amazon forest. He speaks of the psychological progression of his inner reality, as his life unfolded: from an urban youth in Iquitos to a work-camp in the Amazon forest where he was captured, followed by his adoption of tribal lifestyles. This last involved an interior-cosmic recalibration. An Amazonian artistry of visionary perception is layered with reportage from the region's troubled past: episodes of the violent conquest and ruin of native tribal communities during the rubber boom. Calvo thus portrays a double context of fundamental intercultural incomprehension. Yet Ino Moxo, by following his revered teacher the shaman Xumu, manages to transcend the historical contradictions. He both shares and contests the urban landscape of modernity now occupying a place in the Amazonian ecology, while cultivating his own healer's knowledge of forest mysteries. The medium of this transcendence is an imaginary realm of psychic connection and intrasubjective realization, which remains inscrutable and continuous, pathways in a labyrinth.

=== "The real world of Manuel Córdova" ===
A long poem by W. S. Merwin (the recent United States Poet Laureate) offers a running account of the inner life of Córdova, starting with his capture, then his years living in the tribal village, ending with his return. His tribal captors brought him "into their own dream" after which "not one of his syllables touched any surface". The sessions of 'dreaming together' immediately helped his town feet maneuver in the forest according to "a mastered music never heard not even remembered except as a shared dream".

The chief led the dreaming, "his teacher's whispers and gestures had rendered his eyes and ears attuned to powers haunting plants and waters... ". Córdova's identity then became tribal, he "had gone with them into the dream flowing through the forest... ", and "he became all the chief taught him... he went into the dream further and it came out with him into the day and from then on it was all around him... ". Then a lone dream showed him "his family and his mother was dying... . " So, he escaped the forest tribe, returned, yet found "his mother was dead whatever he might need was somewhere that could not be said as though it had never existed".

== Bibliography ==
Primary

- Manuel Córdova-Rios and F. Bruce Lamb, Wizard of the Upper Amazon (New York: Atheneum 1971).
- F. Bruce Lamb, Wizard of the Upper Amazon. The story of Manuel Córdova-Rios (New York: Atheneum 1971; 2d ed., Houghton-Mifflin, Boston 1974; 3d ed., North Atlantic, Berkeley 1974, with foreword by Andrew Weil.
  - Also published as: The Stolen Chief (London: Robert Hale 1972).
  - Der weise Indio vom Amazonas (München: Scherz Verlag 1982).
  - Der Magier vom Amazonas (Reinbeck bei Hamburg: Rawohlt Taschenbuch Verlag 1985).
  - Un brujo del Alto Amazonas. La historia de Manuel Córdova-Ríos (Barcelona: Col. Terra Incognita 1998).
  - La sciamano del Rio della Amazzoni. La storia di Manuel Córdova-Rios (Torino: Edizzioni L'Età dell'Acquerio 2007).
- F. Bruce Lamb, Rio Tigre and Beyond. The Amazon Jungle Medicine of Manuel Córdova (Berkeley: North Atlantic 1985).
  - Au-Dela du Rio Tigre. L'histoire extraordinaire de Manuel Córdova-Ríos (Paris: Editions du Rocher 1997).
  - Río Tigre y más allá. La medicina de la selva del Amazonas de Manuel Córdova (Madrid: José de Olañeta 2002).
- F. Bruce Lamb and Manuel Córdova-Rios, Kidnapped in the Amazon Jungle (Berkeley: North Atlantic 1994).

Secondary

- Robert L. Carneiro, "Chimera of the Upper Amazon" at 94–98, notes at 452–453, in Richard de Mille, editor, The Don Juan Papers (Santa Barbara: Ross-Erikson 1980, 1981).
- Marlene Dobkin de Ríos, [Review of Wizard of the Upper Amazon] in American Anthropologist 74/6: 1423–1424 (1972).
- Willard Johnson, "The most curious beasts in the forest", comprises the Preface at i–xvi to Lamb (1985).
- F. Bruce Lamb, "Wizard of the Upper Amazon as ethnography" in Current Anthropology 22/5: 577–580 (1981)a.
- F. Bruce Lamb, "Comment on Bock's review of The Don Juan Papers" in American Anthropologist 83/3: 641 (1981)b.
- Luis Eduardo Luna and Pablo César Amaringo, Ayahuasca Visions. The religious iconography of a Peruvian shaman (Berkeley: North Atlantic 1991, 1999).
- Richard Evans Schultes, [Review of Wizard of the Upper Amazon] in Economic Botany 26: 197–198 (April 1972).
- Amanda Mignonne Smith, "From the rubber boom to Ayawaskha tourism. Shamanic initiation narratives and the comodification of Amazonia" in A Contracorriente 14/3:1-22 (2017).
- Amanda M. Smith, Mapping the Amazon. Literary geography after the rubber boom (Liverpool University 2021).
- Andrew Weil, "Introduction" at v–xii to Wizard of the Upper Amazon (3d ed., 1974).
- "Manuel Córdoba Ríos" in Hombres del Amazonas (Iquitos 1938), pp. 194-195.
- "Wizard of the Upper Amazon" [Review] in Time, 97/10: 82 (March 8, 1971).

Tertiary

- Stephan V. Beyer, Singing to the Plants. A guide to mestizo shamanism in the Upper Amazon (Albuquerque: University of New Mexico Press 2009).
- Robert L. Carneiro, "The Amahuaca and the spirit world" in Ethnology 3: 6–11 (1964).
- Robert L. Carneiro, "Hunting and hunting magic among the Amahuaca of the Peruvian Montaña" in Ethnology 9: 331–341 (1970).
- Robert L. Carneiro, "What happened at the flashpoint? Conjectures on chiefdom formation at the very moment of conception" at 18–42, in E. Redmond, editor, Chiefdoms and Chieftaincy in the Americas (Gainesville: University Press of Florida 1998).
- Wade Davis, One River. Explorations and discoveries in the Amazon Rain Forest (New York: Touchstone 1997).
- Richard de Mille, "Ethnomethodallegory: Garfinkeling in the Wilderness" at 68–90, in his edited The Don Juan Papers (Santa Barbara: Ross-Erikson 1980, 1981).
- Marlene Dobkin de Ríos, Visionary Vine. Psychedelic healing in the Peruvian Amazon (San Francisco: Chandler 1972; reprint 1984, Waveland Press, Prospect Heights IL, as Visionary Vine. Hallucinogenic healing in the Peruvian Amazon.
- Gertrude E. Dole, "Amahuaca" at 7: 33–36, in Encyclopedia of World Culture, volume 7: South America, volume editor: Johannes Wilbert (New York: G. K. Hall 1994).
- Matthew Huxley and Cornell Capa, Farewell to Eden (New York: Harper and Row 1964). Huxley: text; Capa: photography.
- Eduardo Kohn, How Forests Think (University of California 2013).
- Nicole Maxwell, Witch Doctor's Apprentice. Hunting for medicinal plants in the Amazon (Boston: Houghton Mifflin 1961; reprint: MJF, New York 1990).
- Terence McKenna, The Archaic Revival (New York: HarperOne 1991).
- Jonathan Ott, Pharmaotheon. Entheogenic drugs, their plant sources and history (Kennewick WA: Natural Products 1993; 2d ed. 1995).
- Richard Evans Schultes and Robert F. Raffauf, Vine of the Soul. Medicine men, their plants and rituals in the Colombian Amazonia (Oracle AZ: Synergetic Press 1992).
- Benny Shanon, The Antipodes of the Mind. Charting the phenomenology of the ayahuasca experience (Oxford University 2002).
- Andrew Weil, The Natural Mind (Boston: Houghton-Mifflin 1972).

Literature

- César Calvo Soriano, Las tres mitades de Ino Moxo y otros brujos de la Amazonía (Iquitos: Proceso Editores 1981).
  - Le tre metà di Ino Moxo e altri maghi verdi (Milano: Feltrinelli 1982).
  - The Three Halves of Ino Moxo. The teachings of the Wizard of the Upper Amazon (Rochester VT: Inner Traditions 1995).
- W. S. Merwin, "The real world of Manuel Córdova" in his collection of poems Travels (New York: Knopf 1994), pp. 96–114.

== See also ==
- César Calvo Soriano
- Luis Eduardo Luna
- Pablo Amaringo
- Matthew Huxley
- Richard Evans Schultes
- Robert L. Carneiro
- Psychotria viridis
- Banisteriopsis caapi
- Ayahuasca
- Herbalist
- Vegetalista
- Curandero
- Iquitos
- Pucallpa
- Ucayali
- Peruvian Amazon
- Tapiche Ohara's Reserve
- The Emerald Forest
- The Storyteller
