= Pablo Amaringo =

Peruvian artist (1938–2009)

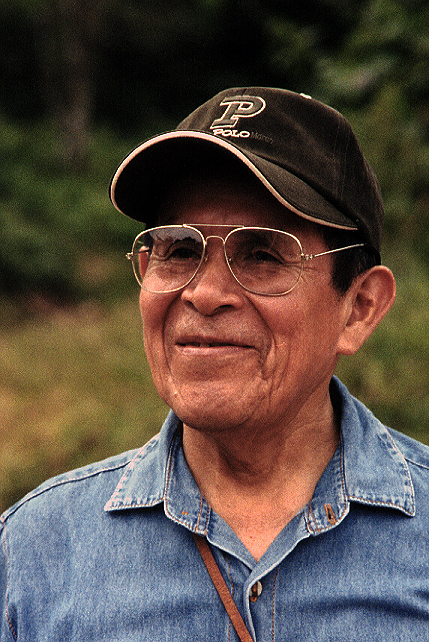
- Pablo Amaringo during a 2002 Ayahuasca Healing Retreat, held in the Brazilian Amazo
- Born: January 21, 1938; Puerto Libertad, Ucayali, Peru
- Died: November 16, 2009
- Occupation: Painter
- Known for: Ayahuasca Visions: The Religious Iconography of a Peruvian Shaman
- Website: https://pablo-amaringo.pixels.com/

Pablo Cesar Amaringo Shuña (January 21, 1938 – November 16, 2009) was a Peruvian artist, renowned for his intricate, colourful depictions of his visions from drinking the entheogenic plant brew ayahuasca. He was first brought to the West's attention by Dennis McKenna and Luis Eduardo Luna, who met Pablo in Pucallpa while traveling during work on an ethnobotanical project. Pablo worked as a vegetalista, a shaman in the mestizo tradition of healing, for many years; up to his death, he painted, helped run the Usko-Ayar school of painting, and supervised ayahuasca retreats.

Before dying, he was working on the paintings of angels, as well as paintings documenting the flora and fauna of Peru.

== Film ==
Pablo's work can be seen in the documentary film Ayahuasca Nature's Greatest Gift.

== Book ==
When Luna and McKenna met Amaringo in 1985, he was living in poverty, barely surviving by teaching English to young people from his home and selling the odd painting to passing tourists. Luna suggested he paint some of his visions, a project which became the basis of a coauthored book, Ayahuasca Visions: The Religious Iconography of a Peruvian Shaman (North Atlantic Books 1999).

Amaringo occasionally gave interviews in the years following the book's publication, and later penned the preface for Plant Spirit Shamanism: Traditional Techniques for Healing the Soul (Destiny Books 2006). His artwork was featured in Graham Hancock's book "Supernatural". Amaringo also appeared in The Shaman & Ayahuasca: Journeys to Sacred Realms (2010), Michael Wiese's documentary film about ayahuasca.

== Death ==
After a protracted illness, Amaringo died on November 16, 2009.

== See also ==
- Alex Grey
- Guillermo Arévalo
- Manuel Córdova-Rios
