= César Calvo =

Peruvian poet, journalist, and author (1940–2000)

César Calvo Soriano (26 July 1940 – 18 August 2000) was a Peruvian poet, journalist, and author. Calvo was part of the "Generación del Sesenta" ("Generation of Sixty"), a group of prominent Peruvian poets that came of age in the 1960s. Considered an important voice in the literature of Peru and the Amazon basin, his work has been celebrated in Latin America and a novel translated into Italian and English.

== Life and career ==
Calvo was born in Iquitos, Loreto, Peru. He was the son of César Calvo de Araujo, the Peruvian painter.

His first chapbook of poetry was published in 1960 when he was twenty; it drew literary praise. At Universidades Nacional Mayor de San Marcos in Lima, his subjects were literature, psychology, and law. He continued to write poetry. In 1974 Calvo was awarded First Prize of the Concurso Hispanoamericano de Literatura, by which he had been honorably mentioned in 1960. In 1976 his works won him the Premio Nacional de Poesía of Peru.

His occupation in journalism included his youthful founding of Expresso in Lima. For several decades he actively participated in newspapers, magazines, and later television. In politics on the left, Calvo was known to be friendly and spontaneous. Apparently he struck up conversations with a wide variety of people, making little distinction as to class, race, social position, or culture.

He once led the Instituto Nacional de Cultura en Iquitos. He also served in Iquitos as Director of the Fundación Pro Selva ("Foundation for the Forest"), involved in the protection of the Amazon ecology, both flora and fauna. He traveled widely; besides Iquitos, Lima, and Cuzco in Peru, he has resided in London, Paris, Rome, Madrid, and Barcelona. Later he served as Director Artístico of the Conjunto Folklórico Perú Negro.

He died suddenly, his last work Edipo entre los Inkas almost finished. Among his major works:

- El Cetro de los Jovenes (Sceptre of the Youth) 1967 [poetry]
- Cancionario (Song Book) 1967 {poetry]
- Pedestal Para Nadie (Pedestal for No One) 1975 [poetry]
- Las Tres Mitades de Ino Moxo y otros Brujos de la Amazonía (Iquitos 1981) [novel]
  - The Three Halves of Ino Moxo: Teachings of the Wizard of the Upper Amazon (Rochester 1995)

== Literary corpus ==
Calvo's work has as major public themes the indigenous cultures of Peru and the struggle for social justice by local people.

=== Poetry ===
His Cancionario is a collection of his poems written in the form of songs, published in 1967. Later many were made the basis of compositions by various singers and musicians. Accordingly, he co-wrote with an Afro-Peruvian chanteuse, the great Chabuca Granda, the landó "María landó". This song became internationally famous later when recorded by another Afro-Peruvian of renown, Susana Baca. It was released on the 1995 compilation CD The Soul of Black Peru.

As a poet for several decades he published volumes and poemarios: Carta para el Tiempo (Map for the Times) 1960; Poemas Bajo Tierra (Poems Underground) 1961; Ausencias y Retardos (Absences and Delays) 1963; El Último poema de Volcek Kalsaretz (The Last Poem of Volcek Kalsaretz) 1965; El Cetro de los Jovenes (Staff of the Young) 1967; Cancionario (Song Book) 1967; Poco antes de partir (A Little Before Parting) 1971; Pedestal Para Nadie (Pedestal for No One) 1975; Como Tatuajes en el Piel de un Río (Like Tattoos on a River's Skin) 1985.

=== Las tres mitades de Ino Moxo ===
Of Calvo's written works perhaps the best known internationally is his novel Las Tres Mitades de Ino Moxo y otros Brujos de la Amazonía (The three halves of Ino Maxo and other wizards of the Amazon) 1981. This work is framed as a journey of Calvo and his cousin into the Amazon forest, to visit the revered shaman Manuel Córdova known as Ino Moxo. Its poetic narrative adopts the intersubjective spiritual perception of Ino Moxo and addresses the tribal aftermath of the violent commercial conquests during the rubber boom.

This autobiographical 1981 novel "has been a hailed by scholars of literary Amazonia as a welcome alternative to the Amazonian novels that see the region from an outsider's perspective." Similar to Mario Vargas Llosa, Calvo discusses the violence to Amazonian people and to the biodiversity. "Unlike Vargas Llosa, however, Calvo imagines a way out through Indigenous Amazonian knowledge."

=== Trilogy ===
Later Calvo authored a trilogy about the background to the attempted assassination of Pope John Paul II: Los Lobos Grises Aúllan en Inglés (The Grey Wolves howl in English) 1985; La Verdad y Solamente la Verdad (The Truth and only the Truth) 1985; and, Los Lobos Aúllan contra Bulgaria (The Wolves howl against Bulgaria) 1990. His last publication was posthumous, a poetic essay entitled Edipo entre los Inkas (Oedipus among the Incas), 3 volumes, 2001.

=== Journalism ===
Calvo early worked as a journalist and editor for newspapers in Lima. His posts included: El Comercio, El Correo, La Republica, and El Popular. Earlier he had founded the daily Expresso in Lima. He contributed to other periodic publications: Gente, Caretas, and Si. He also appeared on television in Peru as a moderator and master of ceremonies. When he left El Popular his journalist articles first appearing there were collected in his Compaña de Palo (Campaign of Sticks) 1986.

== See also ==
- Chabuca Granda
- Susana Baca
- Manuel Córdova-Rios: Las Tres Mitades de Ino Moxo
