= César Calvo de Araujo =

Peruvian writer and painter

César Calvo de Araujo (1910–1970) was a Peruvian writer and painter. A native of Yurimaguas, a town in northeastern Peru, he dedicated his work to the Peruvian Amazon. He died in Lima in 1970. A street and an art gallery in Iquitos are named after him.

== Early life ==
Araujo was born in Yurimaguas, to parents Rafael Calvo Sotomayor and María José Araújo. His father was Peruvian, while his mother was a Portuguese national. He married Graciela Soriano Narváez in 1936, with whom he had four children, one of which was poet César Calvo Soriano.

== Career ==
=== Paintings ===
Araujo had dedicated considerable attention to describing his homeland. He often exhibited in Lima, typically with subjects related to the representation of jungle. The rivers, ponds, the quiet dead waters of the native land swamps do not have any secrets for him, as well as the study of the natives type and the colorful scenes from the riverbanks with their canoes loaded of woodland fruits and their oarsmen shining sweat from the tropical sun.

The art of Cesar Calvo belongs to the narrative and figurative realism. He seizes his scenes directly from the jungle, port life in Iquitos, and other locations in the tropics. When he does so, he does not allow himself drag by the excesses of picturesque details and his painting is rather of damp gray tones, it seems as his palette search the darkness of the closed mounts where weed gets in between with a thick roof of foliage between the soil and the solar light. And when the countryside is open, under the sky that reflects itself in the smooth surface of the slow jungle rivers, he paints it in moments of storm cloud or from a twilight grayish distance.

=== Books ===
His most known book is "Paiche", described by himself on its prolog as a Socialist novel, written in a mix of formal Spanish and Amazonic dialectal Spanish.

== Death ==
Araujo died in Lima on October 21, 1970.

== See also ==
- César Calvo Soriano
