= Benny Shanon =

Israeli professor of psychology (1948–2025)

- בני שנון
- Born: 1948; Tel Aviv, Israel
- Died: January 30, 2025; Jerusalem, Israel
- Title: Professor Emeritus at Hebrew University of Jerusalem

Academic background
- Education: Tel Aviv University
- Alma mater: Stanford University

Academic work
- Discipline: Psychologist
- Notable works: The Representational and the Presentational: An Essay on Cognition and the Study of Mind Antipodes of the Mind: Charting the Phenomenology of the Ayahuasca Experience

Benny Shanon (Hebrew: בני שנון; 1948 – January 30, 2025) was a professor of psychology at the Hebrew University of Jerusalem and held the Mandel Chair in cognitive psychology and education. Born in Tel Aviv, Shanon studied philosophy and linguistics at Tel Aviv University and received his doctorate in experimental psychology from Stanford University. He is best known for his research on the cognitive effects of ayahuasca and the Biblical entheogen hypothesis, the idea that the use of hallucinogenic drugs influenced religion.

== Work ==
In 1993, Shannon published The Representational and the Presentational: An Essay on Cognition and the Study of Mind, in which he criticised the Representational-Computational View of Mind and proposed an alternative perspective on the mind, in which the basic capabilities of the cognitive system are not the manipulation of symbols, but rather action in the world.

Shanon is also the author of the 2002 book Antipodes of the Mind: Charting the Phenomenology of the Ayahuasca Experience published by Oxford University Press. In this work, Shanon provides a rough cartography of the visions and non-visual effects ayahuasca can induce. He writes that he had consumed ayahuasca himself several hundred times and gathered a corpus of empirical data from published literature, structured and unstructured interviews he conducted and his personal experience. In total the corpus comprises some 2,500 ayahuasca experiences.

== Biblical entheogen hypothesis ==
Shanon's controversial theory that the patriarch Moses was under the influence of hallucinogens when he received the law, is referred to as the Biblical entheogen hypothesis. His paper, Biblical Entheogens: a Speculative Hypothesis details parallels between the effects induced by the psychedelic brew ayahuasca, and the Bible's account of the life of Moses. In particular, he draws attention to five specific episodes of Moses' life that he believes exhibit patterns very similar to the experience encountered by those under the influence of ayahuasca:

- Moses' vision of the burning bush
- When rods belonging to Moses' brother Aaron, and the Pharaoh's sorcerers, are transformed into serpents.
- The theophany at Mount Sinai, when Moses is given the Ten Commandments.
- Exodus 33:12–23, when Moses asks to see God, but God tells him that he'll cover Moses with his hand so he can see only his back, not his face, "for there shall no man see Me and live."
- The shining appearance of Moses' face when he brings back the Ten Commandments on his second return from the Mount. (Exodus 34:30.)

Encountering the Divine, altered perception of time, synaesthesia, fear of impending death, and visions of fire, serpents, light perceived as God, and entities whose faces aren't visible, are all experiences that Shanon has found to be common after ingesting ayahuasca, and most are "especially symptomatic" of ayahuasca. It is these experiences, among others, that Shanon parallels with the above events of Moses' life. He also makes note of the similarities between the three-day purification before the Ten Commandments were revealed and the traditional contexts of ayahuasca use; the "shining" appearance of people after taking ayahuasca with Moses' appearance after returning the second time from the Mount; as well as the responsiveness of the ayahuasca experience to certain personality traits that Moses possessed. He further corroborates his hypothesis with botanical and ethnobotanical information, linguistic considerations, exegesis of Talmudic and mystical Jewish texts, as well as data on the effects of a substance analogous to ayahuasca. Shannon states that his hypothesis is "admittedly speculative". He concludes by saying:

Taken together, the botanical and anthropological data on the one hand, and the biblical descriptions as well as later Jewish hermeneutics on the other, are, I propose, suggestive of a biblical entheogenic connection. Admittedly, the smoking gun is not available to us. However, so many clues present themselves which, like the pieces of a jigsaw puzzle, seem to cohere into an intriguing unified whole. I leave it to the reader to pass his or her judgment.

== See also ==
- John Marco Allegro
