= Luis Eduardo Luna =

Anthropologist

Luis Eduardo Luna is an anthropologist and ayahuasca researcher.

== Biography ==
Luna was born in 1947, in Florencia, Colombia. At age 13 he attended seminary in Bogotá, Colombia, and at 18 traveled to Spain to continue education in theology and philosophy both in monasteries in northern Spain and at the Universidad Complutense de Madrid. He received his doctorate in 1989 from the Institute of Comparative Religion at Stockholm University, as well as an honorary doctorate in 2000 from Saint Lawrence University, New York. He currently is a language teacher at the Hanken School of Economics in Helsinki, Finland.

== Research ==
Luna is best known for his research of the entheogenic tea ayahuasca. His research has focused on traditional indigenous usage as well as the newer syncretic ayahuasca churches such as Santo Daime and the União do Vegetal. He is the director of Wasiwaska, Research Centre for the Study of Psychointegrator Plants, Visionary Arts, and Consciousness, located in Brazil; currently, they are studying the neurological aspects of ayahuasca inebriation on the central nervous system.

== Writings ==
- Vegetalismo: Shamanism Among the Mestizo Population of the Peruvian Amazon, 1986, ISBN 91-22-00819-5
- Ayahuasca Visions: The Religious Iconography of a Peruvian Shaman with Pablo Amaringo, 1991, ISBN 1-55643-064-7
- Inner Paths to Outer Space: Journeys to Alien Worlds through Psychedelics and Other Spiritual Technologies with Rick Strassman, Slawek Wojtowicz M.D Ede Frecska M.D, 2008, ISBN 1-59477-224-X
