= Chazuta District =

- District
- Location within Peru
- Coordinates: 6.5736°S 76.1324°W
- Country: Peru
- Region: San Martín
- Province: San Martín
- Founded: January 2, 1857
- Capital: Chazuta

Government
  - Mayor: Isaac Tangoa Panaifo

Area
  - Total: 966.38 km^{2} (373.12 sq mi)
- Elevation: 150 m (490 ft)

Population (2005 census)
  - Total: 9,563
  - Density: 9.896/km^{2} (25.63/sq mi)
- Time zone: UTC-5 (PET)
- UBIGEO: 220904

Chazuta District is one of fourteen districts of the province San Martín in Peru. San Martín Province is located in north central Peru, in San Martín Region, a highland area on the edge of the Amazon Basin. Immediately to the east of San Martín Region is the large lowland region of Loreto, in the northeast corner of Peru. The area is home to members of the Kichwa-Lamista ethnicity, who migrated to the area from province of Lamas between 1850 and 1920.

== Climate ==
Climate data for Chazuta, elevation 203 m (666 ft), (1991–2020)
Month	Jan	Feb	Mar	Apr	May	Jun	Jul	Aug	Sep	Oct	Nov	Dec	Year
Mean daily maximum °C (°F)	33.0 (91.4)	32.8 (91.0)	32.1 (89.8)	32.4 (90.3)	32.5 (90.5)	32.4 (90.3)	33.1 (91.6)	34.0 (93.2)	34.8 (94.6)	34.1 (93.4)	33.6 (92.5)	33.2 (91.8)	33.2 (91.7)
Mean daily minimum °C (°F)	22.6 (72.7)	22.6 (72.7)	22.4 (72.3)	21.7 (71.1)	22.3 (72.1)	21.3 (70.3)	20.4 (68.7)	20.7 (69.3)	21.5 (70.7)	21.9 (71.4)	22.8 (73.0)	22.5 (72.5)	21.9 (71.4)
Average precipitation mm (inches)	143.2 (5.64)	175.6 (6.91)	189.3 (7.45)	141.8 (5.58)	101.0 (3.98)	74.4 (2.93)	69.5 (2.74)	59.9 (2.36)	95.6 (3.76)	137.8 (5.43)	152.0 (5.98)	152.9 (6.02)	1,493 (58.78)
Source: National Meteorology and Hydrology Service of Peru
