= Tapiche District =

Coordinates: 5.6667°S 74.1500°W

Tapiche
- District
- Interactive map of Tapiche
- Country: Peru
- Region: Loreto
- Province: Requena
- Founded: July 2, 1943
- Capital: Iberia

Government
  - Mayor: Jorge Antonio Rios Torres

Area
  - Total: 2,014.23 km^{2} (777.70 sq mi)
- Elevation: 119 m (390 ft)

Population (2005 census)
  - Total: 913
  - Density: 0.453/km^{2} (1.17/sq mi)
- Time zone: UTC-5 (PET)
- UBIGEO: 160509

Tapiche District is one of eleven districts of the province Requena in Peru.
