= Pucallpa =

City in Ucayali, Peru

Pucallpa May Ushin Pukallpa
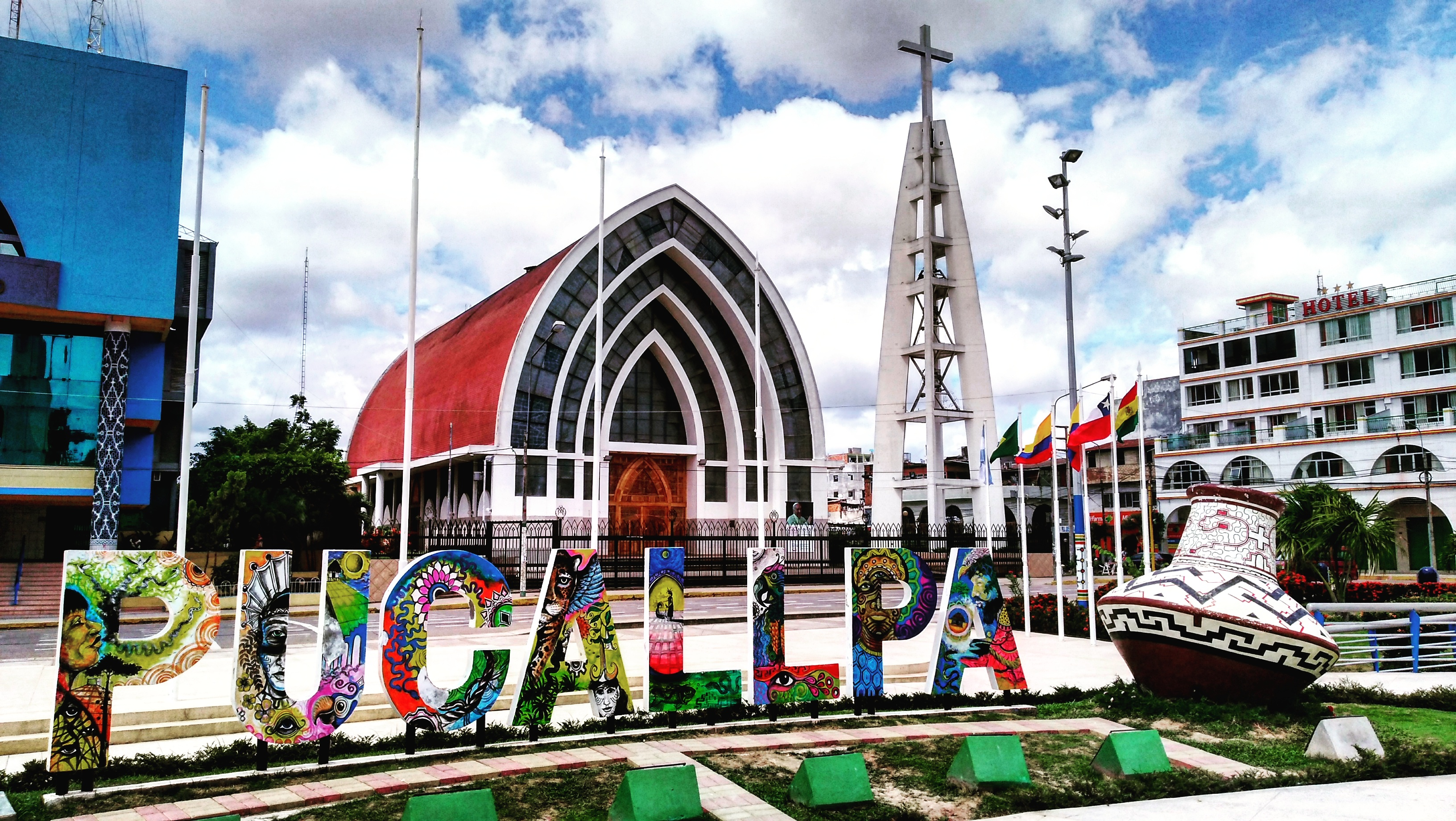
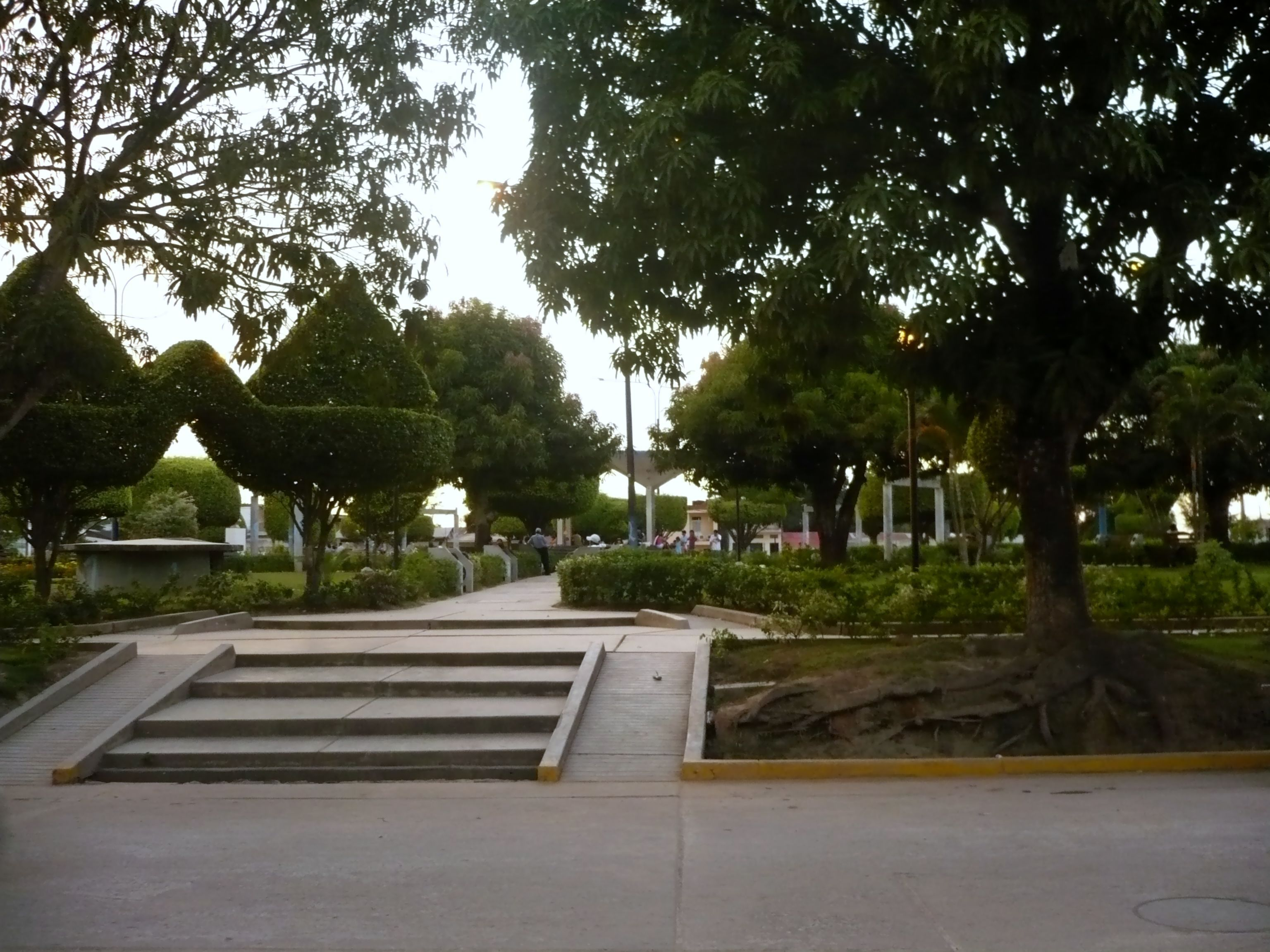
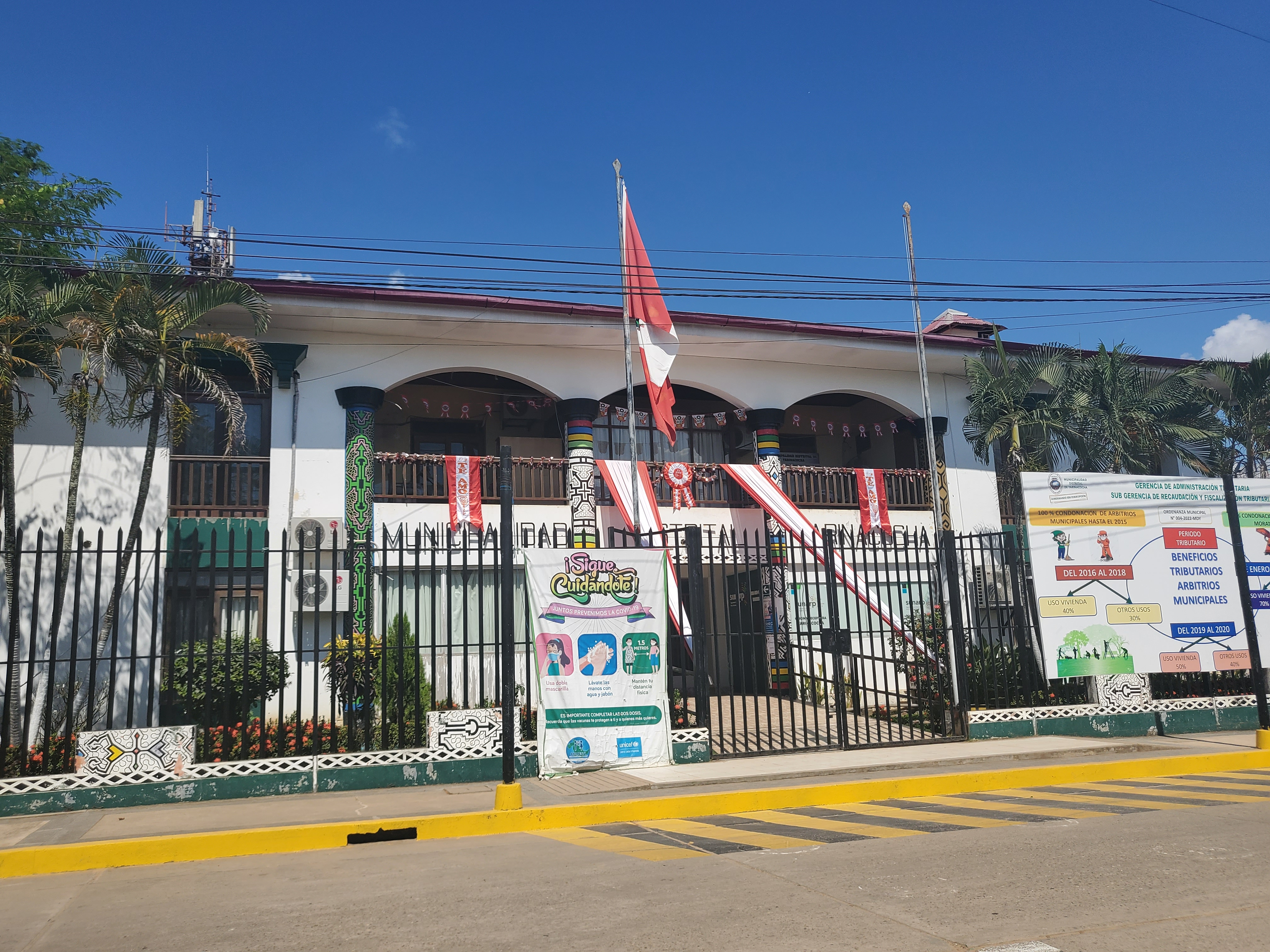
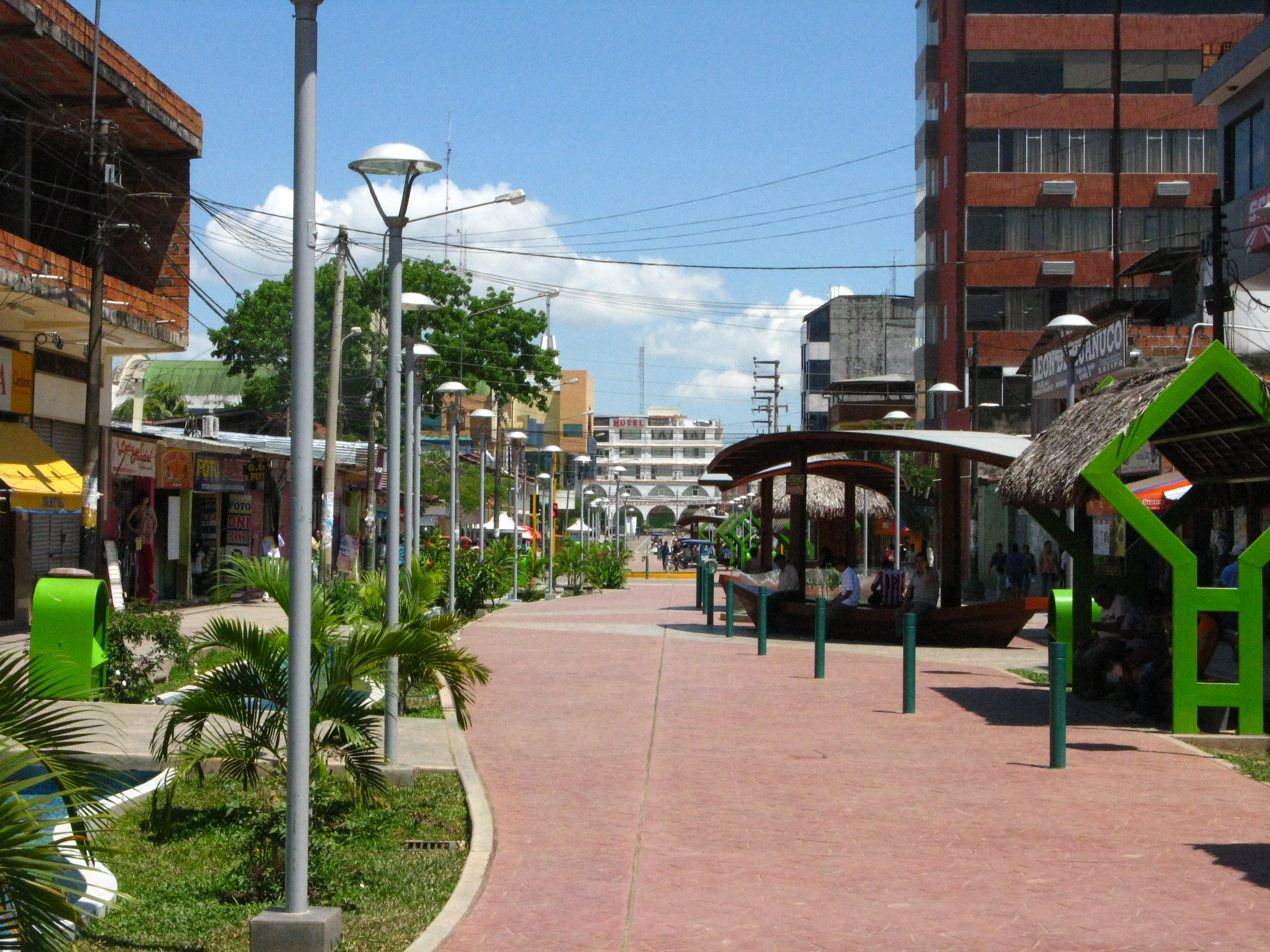
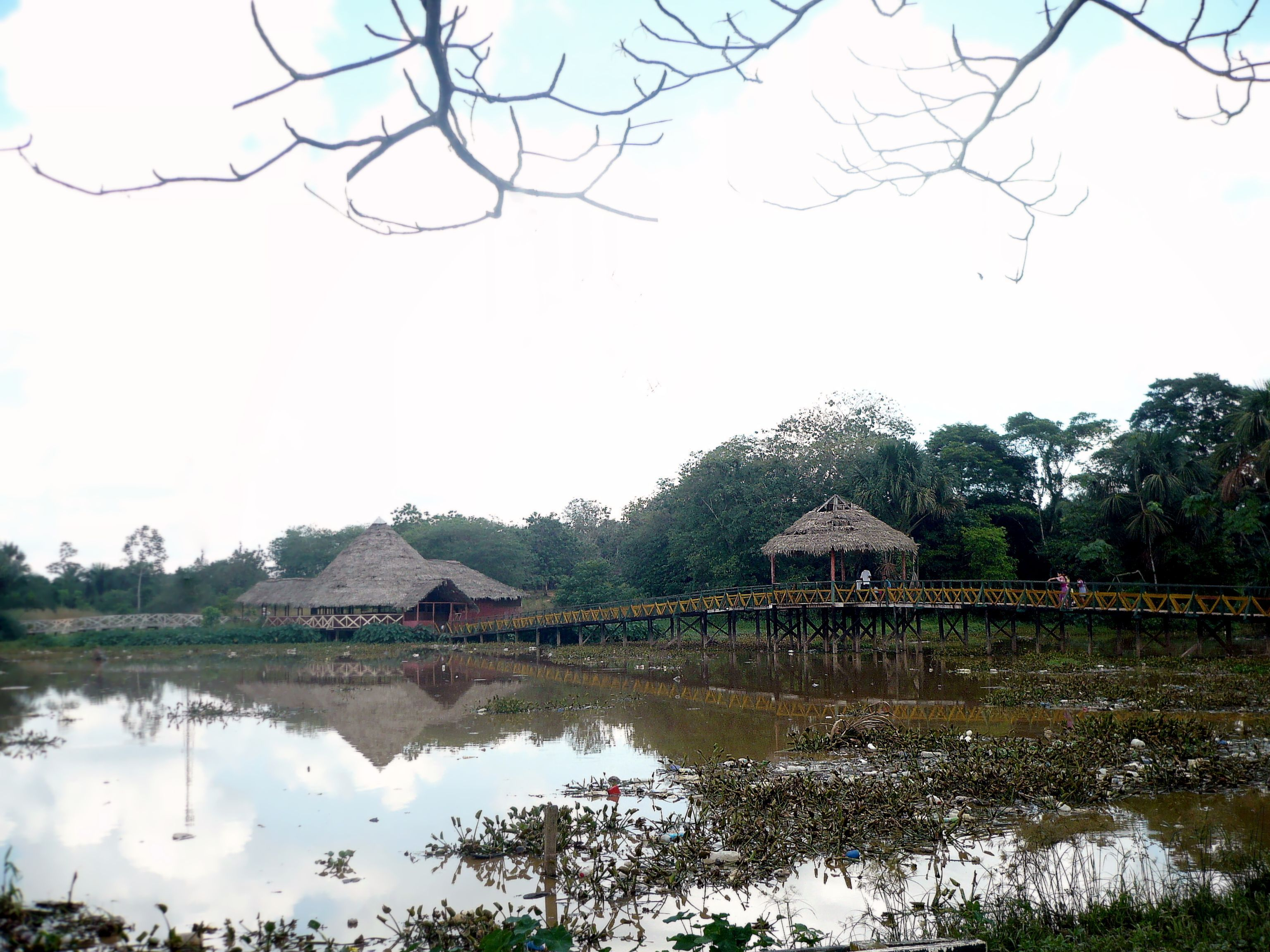
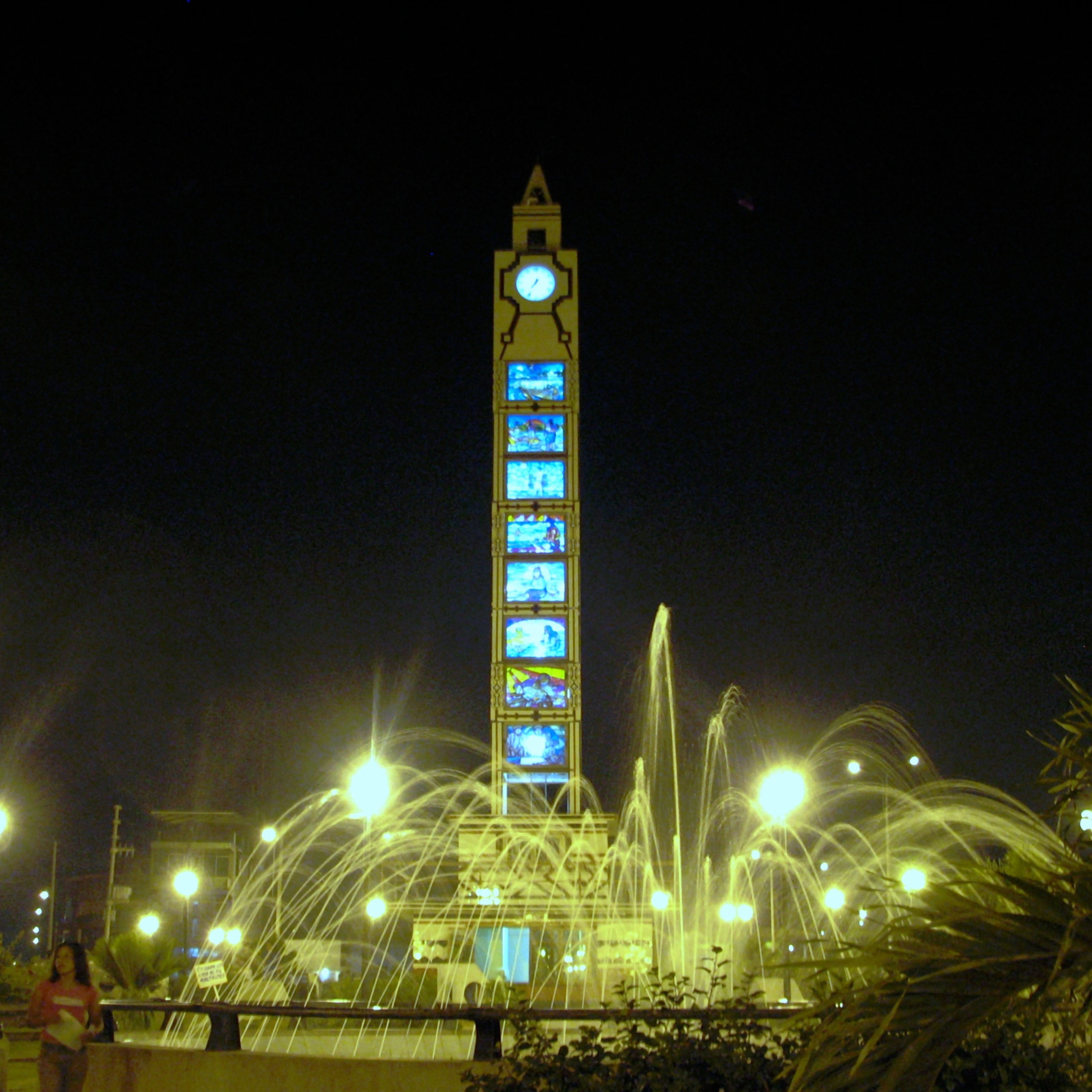
- Main square, plaza de armas, municipal building, Tacna avenue, Natural park of Pucallpa and San Martín Square.

- Flag Coat of arms
- Nickname: La tierra colorada (The Crimson Land)
- Location within Peru
- Coordinates: 8°23′S 74°31′W
- Country: Peru
- Region: Ucayali
- Province: Coronel Portillo
- Settled: 1840s

Government
  - Mayor: Oris Isis Laurel Alban (2019–2022)

Area
  - Land: 29 km^{2} (11 sq mi)
- Elevation: 154 m (505 ft)

Population (2020)
  - Total: 326,040
  - Density: 11,000/km^{2} (29,000/sq mi)
- Time zone: UTC-5 (PET)
  - Summer (DST): UTC-5 (PET)
- Website: mpcp.gob.pe

Pucallpa (Spanish pronunciation: [pu'kalpa], Quechua: puka allpa, lit. 'red dirt'; Shipibo: May Ushin) is a city in eastern Peru located on the banks of the Ucayali River, a major tributary of the Amazon River. It is the capital of the Ucayali region, the Coronel Portillo Province and the Calleria District. The city is categorized as the only metropolis in Ucayali, being the largest populated center of the region. According to the Instituto Nacional de Estadística e Informática, it is the tenth most populated city in Peru and second largest in the Peruvian Amazon after Iquitos. In 2017, it had a population of 211,611 inhabitants.

Although originally located in the district of Callería, in the 1980s it formed a conurbation with the towns of Puerto Callao (district of Yarinacocha) and San Fernando (district of Manantay, created in 2000).

Most of the transport to Pucallpa is done through the Ucayali River, located in the central east of Peru and which contains the second most important river port in the Peruvian Amazon (behind Iquitos). The Federico Basadrees highway is the main center of land transportation and connects the northwest of the city with the Captain Rolden International Airport (Aeropuerto Internacional Capitán FAP David Abensur Rengifo), with flights to Brazil.

The economy of Pucallpa is based on trade, the timber industry and tourism. Among the main attractions of the city include ecological tourism, such as the Parque Natural, or cultural tourism, in the case of shamanism. Its main economic activities are fishing, agriculture, livestock and timber extraction. In addition, a small oil refinery near the Pachitea River and a gas refinery in the Curimaná District supply fuel to the city and the center of the country.

The first human inhabitants of the region were the Pano, who inhabited the entire length of the Ucayali River and its tributaries three millennia before colonization.

== History ==
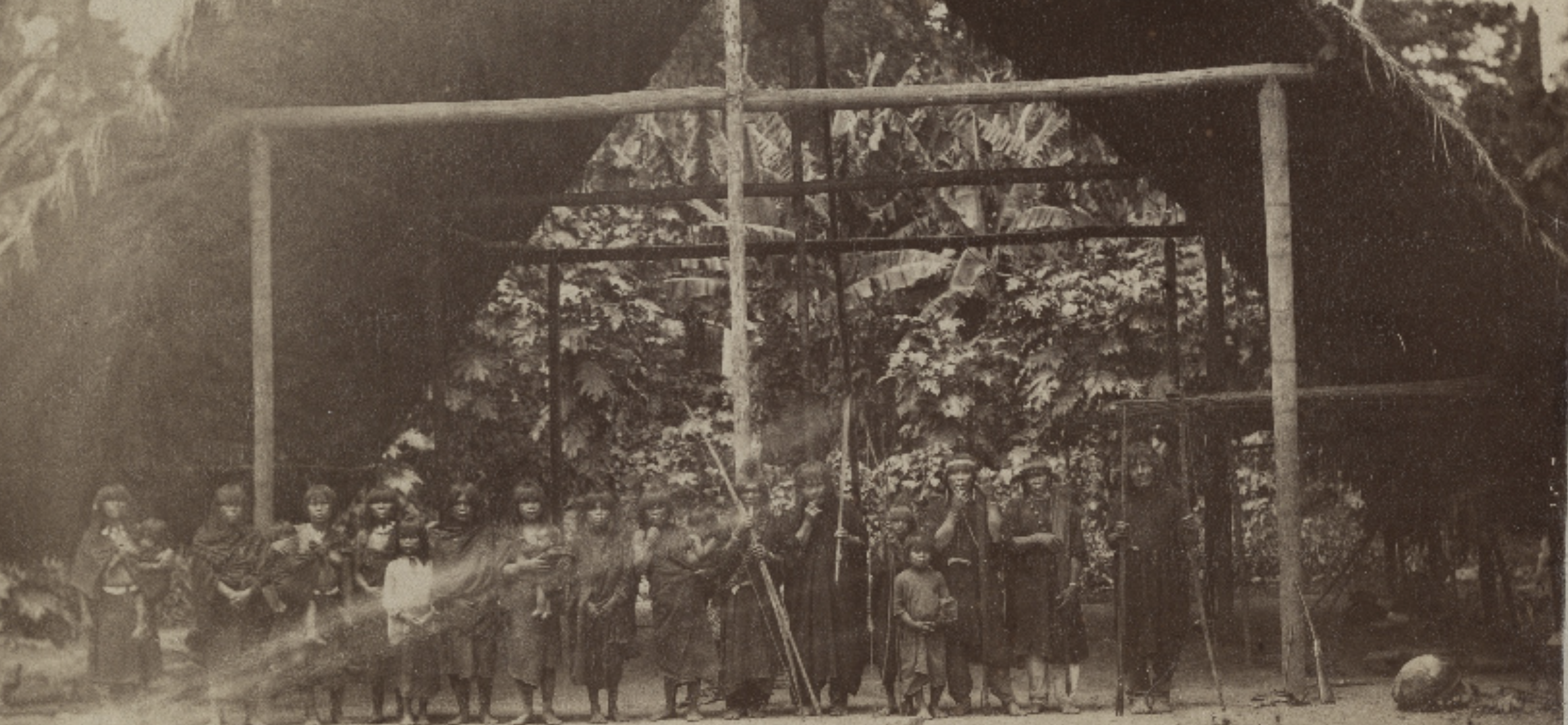
Photograph of Conibo Natives

Before the colonization of South America, the entire jungle was inhabited by natives. Colonization was very difficult due to diseases that occurred or attacks by strangers, so there was not enough information to know how they lived. Explorations began in the 15th century. The first Franciscans began to gradually found villages between the Ucayali River and the Perené River. Pucallpa originated in the central jungle (between the current countries of Peru, Brazil and Bolivia). There existed the Shipibo-Konibo ethnic group, one of the indigenous groups of eastern Peru, belonging to the Pano linguistic family and living on the banks of the Ucayali River and its tributaries Pisqui, Callería, and Aguaytia and on the shores of the Tamaya and Yarinacocha lakes. Sometimes the Shipibo territory is considered to be downstream of the Ucayali and the Conibo culture upstream, but in reality there are communities of both groups in the two areas because they have mixed with each other. The Shetebo, an ancient culture who lived below Contamana, are now integrated with the Shipibos. At that time the population was about 25,000 people, distributed among 108 hamlets or native communities. The environment was very ecological and simplified, remaining preserved for years. The houses were made of palm leaves and ventilated and they lived in the forest. Their deceased were secretly buried in vessels in their own homes. They survived by fishing, and used medicinal plants as medical recipes.

In 1779 Pucallpa was part of the Municipality of Trujillo that came to have nine parties that were Trujillo, Lambayeque, Piura, Cajamarca, Huamachuco, Chota, Moyobamba, Chachapoyas, Jaén and Maynas, this last party previously made up the departments of what is known today such as (Department of San Martín, Ucayali, Loreto) with the Municipality of Trujillo being the largest in the Viceroyalty of Peru, that is, almost all of northern Peru today; Its first mayor was Fernando Saavedra from 1784 to 1791.After this he would be followed by Vicente Gil de Taboada (1791-1805 and 1810–1820), Felice del Risco y Torres (provisional) (1805–1810) and the marquis of Torre Tagle (1820), who led the independence of the Municipality. It was part of the Government of the General Command of Maynas, which was a territorial division of the Spanish Empire in the Viceroyalty of Peru, created by a royal decree of July 15, 1802.

The city of Pucallpa was founded in the 1840s by Franciscan missionaries who settled several families of the Shipibo-Conibo ethnic group. For several decades it remained a small settlement as it was isolated from the rest of the country by the Amazon rainforest and the Andes mountain range.

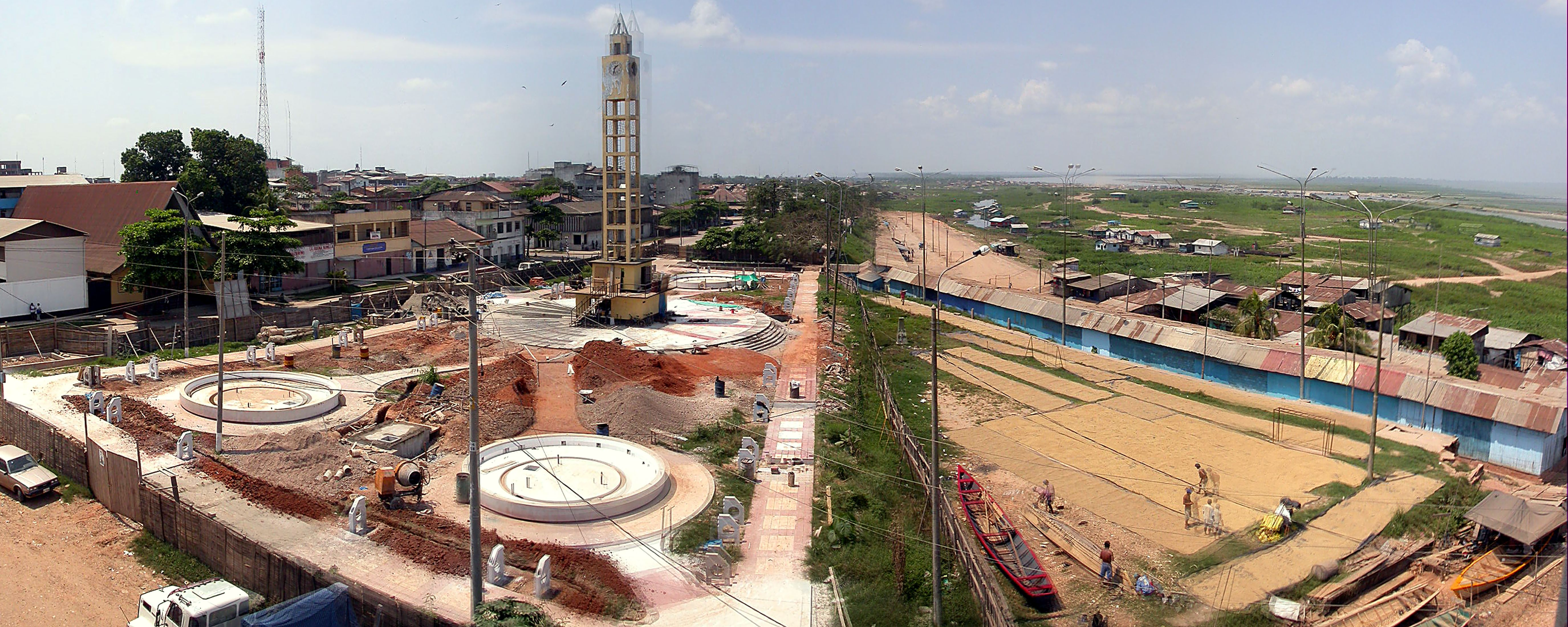
Construction of the new Plaza de Armas in 2004

In 1901, the First Municipal Council of the City of Pucallpa was established, and in a Municipal Council Session, Mayor Pedro Pablo Gaviria Saldaña granted his Municipal Councilors Antonio Maya de Brito and Agustín Cauper Videira the Title of Founders of the City of Pucallpa. Pucallpa. Traditional history estimates that the founding of Pucallpa was on October 13, 1888, which coincides with its jubilee week, a festival of that city. The identity of the founder is discussed by the municipality, since the honor is attributed to three people: the Peruvian Eduardo del Águila Tello (born in San Martín) or the Brazilians Agustín Cáuper Videira and Antonio Maya de Brito, who, although unknown, are popular today. At the moment, a fixed founding date has not been established, because it was not the product of an act of settlement, but rather of a gradual process of population and cantonment of settlers. Oral sources indicate that, starting in the 1850s, the first settlers began to arrive in this town, although a small native settlement already existed.

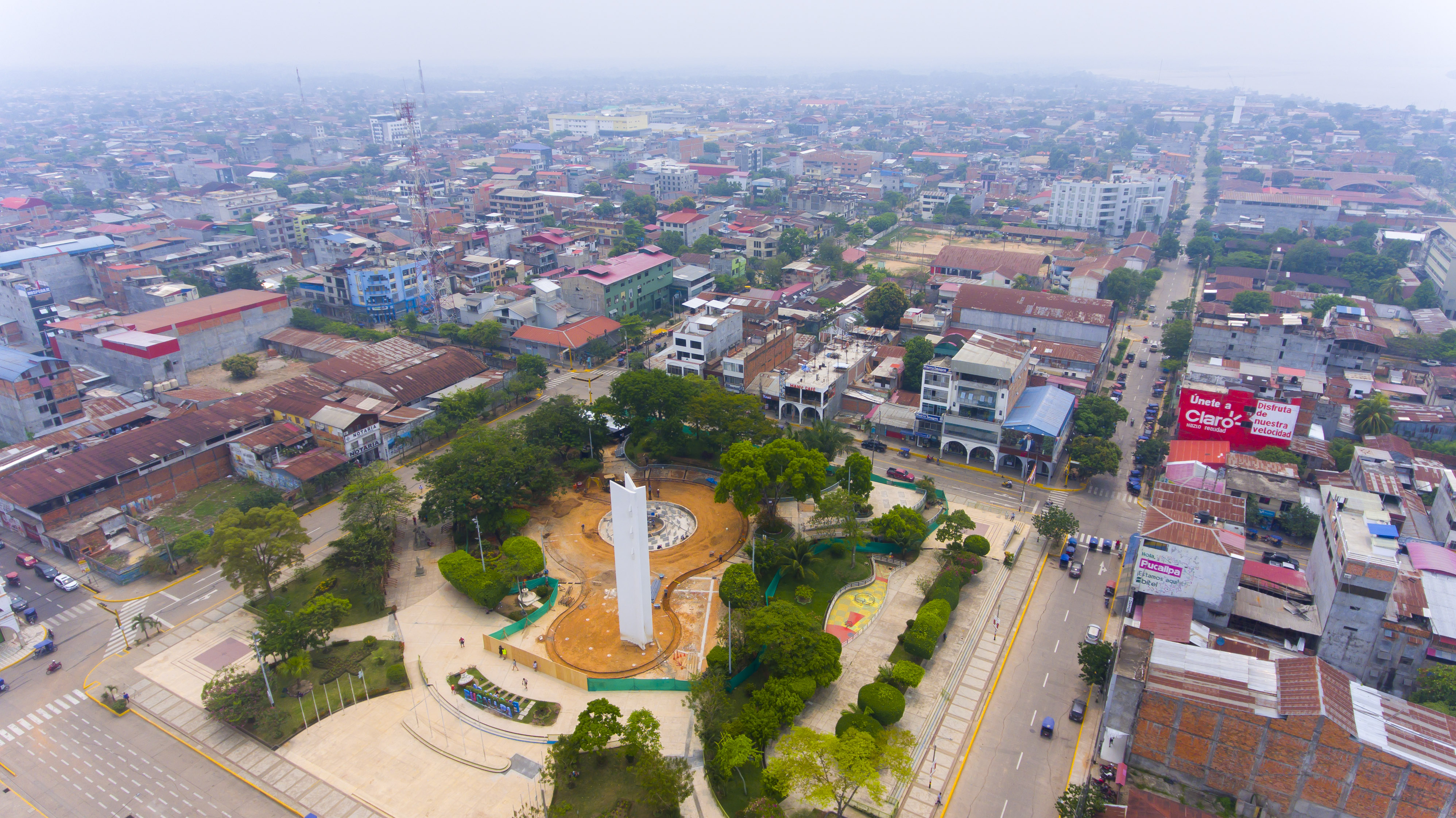
Pucallpa in 2024

From the 1880s through the 1920s a railway project to connect Pucallpa with the rest of the country via the Ferrocarril Central Andino was started and dropped several times until it was finally abandoned. Pucallpa's isolation finally ended in 1945 with the completion of a highway to Lima through Tingo Maria. The highway allowed the commercialization of regional products to the rest of the country, thus improving the economic outlook of the region and its capital, Pucallpa. However, the heavy rainfalls of the Amazon rainforest remain a problem as they erode the highway and can even undermine it by causing flash floods. Pucallpa is served by air through the Captain Rolden International Airport and by river through its port Pucallpillo near the center of the city. During the high water season, the floating ports of La Hoyada and Puerto Italia are used for riverine communications. Pucallpa is connected by road to Lima via Huánuco and Cerro de Pasco. The San Lorenzo Megaport Project proposes to connect Lima with the Atlantic via a rail connection to Pucallpa and the Amazon.

Numerous projects were made and completed in the 2000s which helped improve life in Pucallpa.

== Geography ==
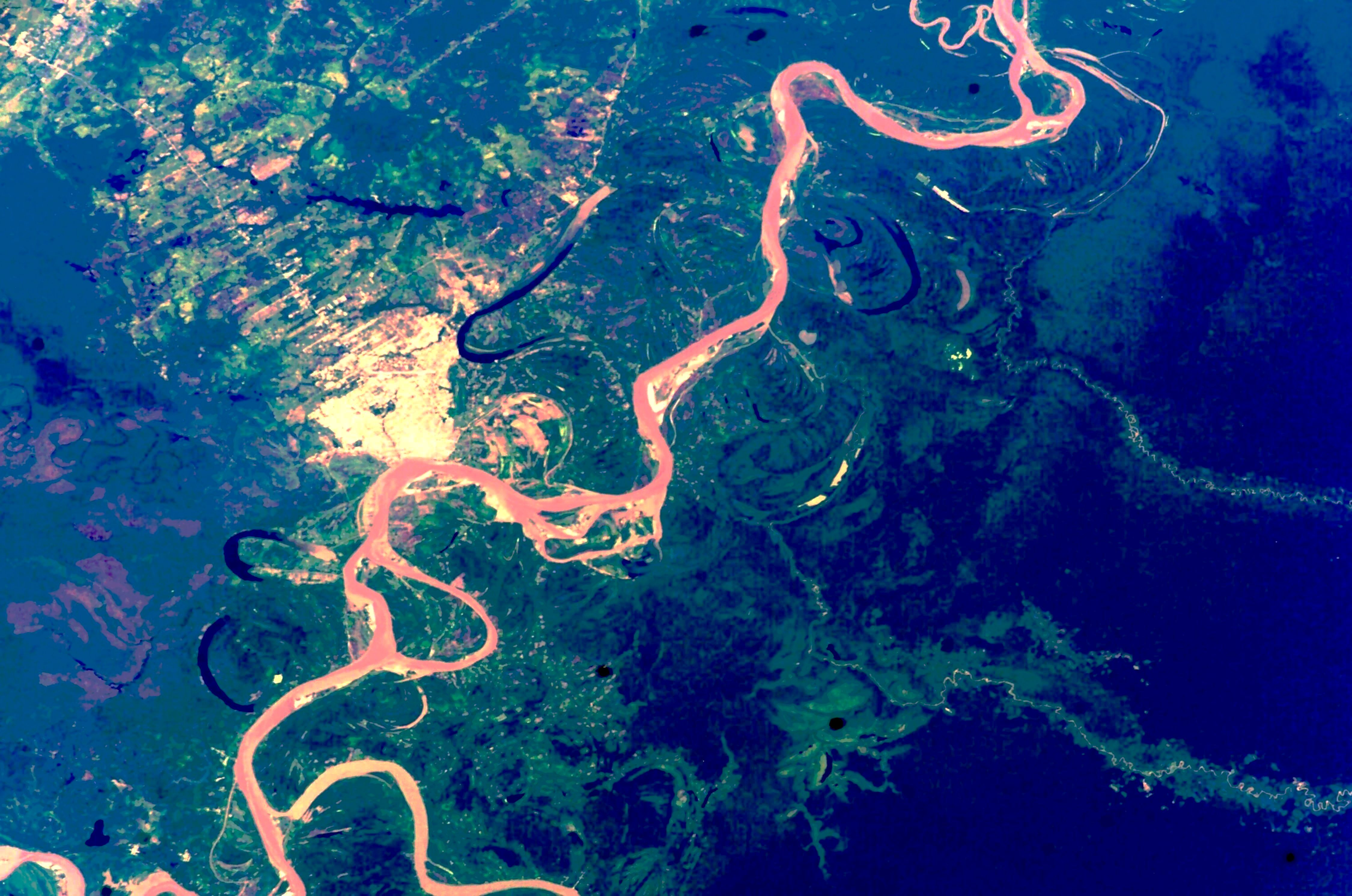
Aerial view of Pucallpa taken by NASA in 2002

Pucallpa occupies 0.05% of the province of Coronel Portillo, which represents almost 15% of the original district. The comparison between the years 1975 and 2010 shows that the urban area was annexed irregularly. The city borders the district of Campoverde and neighboring villages starting from Puerto Callao.

=== Climate ===
The city of Pucallpa has a tropical monsoon climate with warm temperatures all year round, classified as Am according to the Köppen climate classification. The average temperature is 26 °C, with peaks that can reach 34 °C on the hottest days. In mid-2008, the temperature reached 37 °C. Precipitation occurs between the months of October and December. During this period, the temperature drops to approximately 21.5 °C. More than 41.1 °C has been reported, being among the hottest records in the lowland jungle. The rainfall reaches 1570 mm. In 2009, the maximum rainfall was 12.2 cm (March) and the minimum was 3.44 cm (August). In addition, ultraviolet indices can reach 10+. Thunderstorms rarely occur in Pucallpa; However, other natural phenomena can occur such as strong winds that can reach 40 km/h and have caused air accidents. One of the most recent cases occurred on August 23, 2005, when TANS Perú Flight 204 crashed before reaching the terminal. The accident was caused by a strong storm a few kilometers from the city. Another case was in 1971 (LANSA Flight 508), where there was only one survivor (Juliane Koepcke).

Climate data for Pucallpa
Month	Jan	Feb	Mar	Apr	May	Jun	Jul	Aug	Sep	Oct	Nov	Dec	Year
Record high °C (°F)	42.0 (107.6)	40.8 (105.4)	37.8 (100.0)	37.2 (99.0)	34.2 (93.6)	36.2 (97.2)	36.5 (97.7)	40.5 (104.9)	37.2 (99.0)	36.5 (97.7)	36.2 (97.2)	37.8 (100.0)	42.0 (107.6)
Mean daily maximum °C (°F)	31.3 (88.3)	30.7 (87.3)	30.7 (87.3)	30.9 (87.6)	30.4 (86.7)	30.3 (86.5)	30.4 (86.7)	31.8 (89.2)	32.3 (90.1)	31.7 (89.1)	31.5 (88.7)	31.6 (88.9)	31.1 (88.0)
Daily mean °C (°F)	26.7 (80.1)	26.4 (79.5)	26.2 (79.2)	26.2 (79.2)	26.2 (79.2)	25.6 (78.1)	25.4 (77.7)	26.0 (78.8)	26.7 (80.1)	26.8 (80.2)	26.6 (79.9)	26.9 (80.4)	26.3 (79.3)
Mean daily minimum °C (°F)	22.4 (72.3)	22.3 (72.1)	22.3 (72.1)	22.1 (71.8)	21.5 (70.7)	20.5 (68.9)	19.8 (67.6)	20.4 (68.7)	21.1 (70.0)	21.8 (71.2)	22.2 (72.0)	22.4 (72.3)	21.6 (70.9)
Record low °C (°F)	18.5 (65.3)	17.6 (63.7)	13.8 (56.8)	12.8 (55.0)	15.0 (59.0)	12.2 (54.0)	11.1 (52.0)	11.6 (52.9)	14.0 (57.2)	15.0 (59.0)	17.8 (64.0)	17.8 (64.0)	11.1 (52.0)
Average rainfall mm (inches)	147 (5.8)	165 (6.5)	191 (7.5)	163 (6.4)	104 (4.1)	66 (2.6)	51 (2.0)	56 (2.2)	91 (3.6)	168 (6.6)	185 (7.3)	180 (7.1)	1,565 (61.6)
Average rainy days (≥ 1.0 mm)	14	11	12	12	9	6	5	6	7	11	10	11	114
Average relative humidity (%)	87	88	88	88	87	88	86	84	85	86	87	86	86
Source: Deutscher Wetterdienst

=== Drinking water and drainage ===
The Municipal Drinking Water and Sewerage Company of Coronel Portillo (Español: La Empresa Municipal de Agua Potable y Alcantarillado de Coronel Portillo) is the main company in water management, beginning operation on 1 July 1992. The company aims to carry out all activities related to the provision of public drinking water and sewerage service in the area of the province of Coronel Portillo through its headquarters in the east of Pucallpa. Much of its work in supplying water is aimed at connection and supply. Houses have a connection to the public water service in Coronel Portillo, and 28% more water has been used within the four provinces.

=== Energy ===
Electricity is managed by the company Electro Ucayali, created on 28 February 1995. This company is located in the eastern part of the country, and its activities correspond to an isolated electrical system in the same region. The administrative seat of Electro Ucayali is in the district of Yarinacocha.

Since 2001, the government has installed transmission lines from the Aguaytía river. The actions and work of this company had led to several inconveniences for its workers, such as 24 hour blackouts. There has been a negative reception to this company's service, with some calling it "Electropeor". One reason for this is due to service outages that have negatively affected the city for the past 20 years.

== Demographics ==
The city of Pucallpa, includes the districts of Callería with 149,999 inhabitants, Yarinacocha with 103,941 inhabitants and Manantay with 87,525 inhabitants. According to the National Institute of Statistics and Informatics, it is the tenth most populated city in Peru and was home to a population of 341,465 inhabitants in 2017. As of 2024, it has a population of

Pucallpa is one of the fastest growing cities nationwide in Peru, marked by its immigration to the department (a third of those who live come from other departments). It had a population of 170,000 inhabitants in 2000, its average growth rate being 5.6% between 1981 and 1993.[59] In the World Gazetteer it appears with a population of 283,292 inhabitants (339th among the most inhabited localities in America, 2010). ). Pucallpa had a great expansion, in 1981 it had a population of 89,604 inhabitants, in 1993 it had 172,286, and in 2005 it reached 248,878 inhabitants, based on official censuses and the global dictionary.

== Economy ==
=== Supply Chain ===
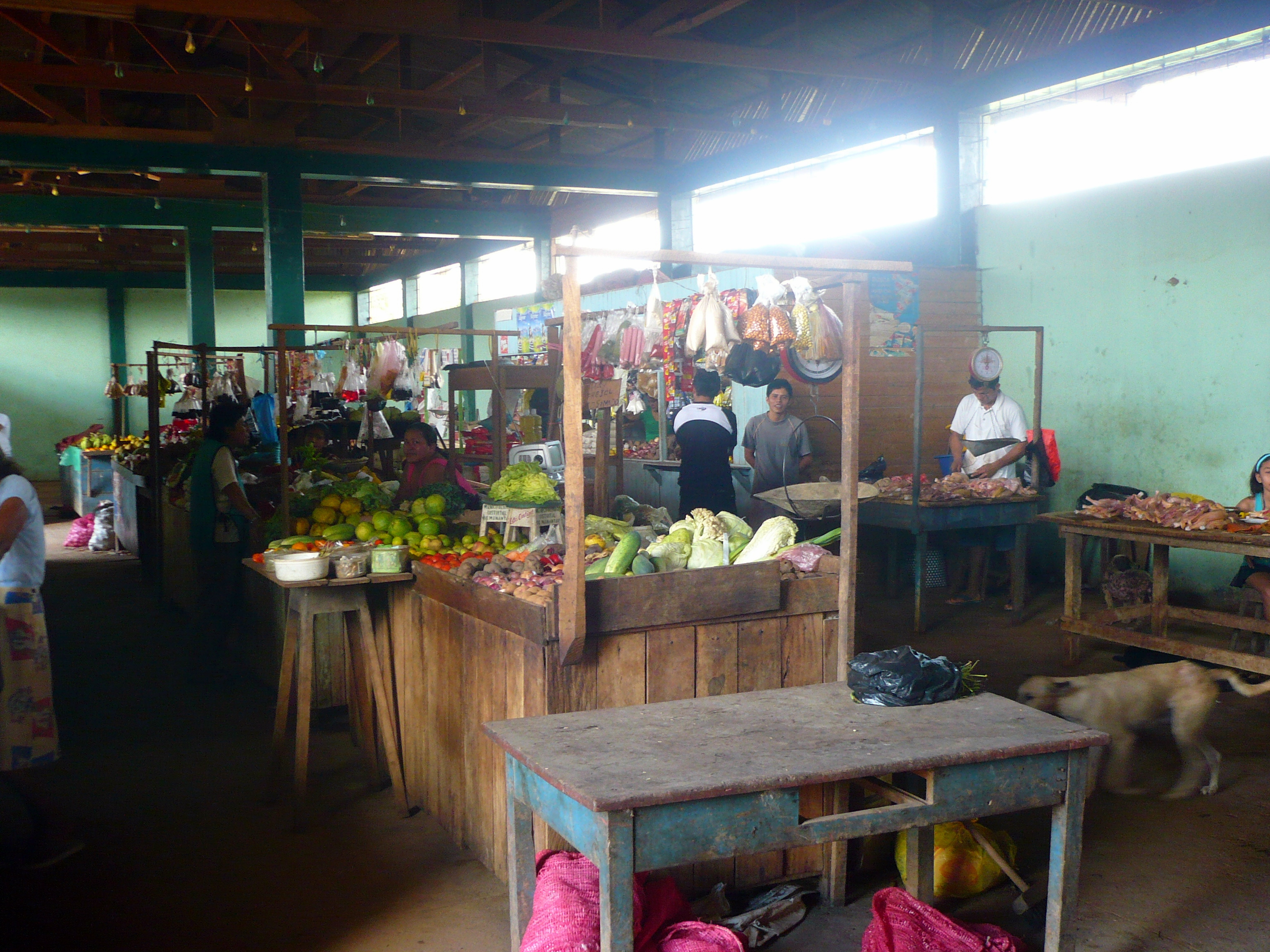
Manantay Market

The city is home to 9 municipal markets. 5 of these are located in the district of Callería, and 1 is located in the district of Yarinacocha. The 9 municipal markets are as follows:

==== Municipal markets ====
- Municipal Market 1: Market located on the banks of the Ucayali River.
- Municipal Market 2: Market located in the center of the city, two blocks south of the municipality.
- Municipal Market 3: Market located between the Guillermo Sisley and Victor Montalvo streets.
- Municipal Market 4: (or Micaela Bastidas) Market belonging to the district of Manantay, located at kilometer 2 of the centennial avenue. In 2009, this site also housed a municipal fair with 800 commercial stores.
- Yarinacocha Municipal Market: Market of the Yarinense district, located a few blocks east of the district's main square.
- Manantay Municipal Market: Market of the Maintaino district, located in the Maya de Brito street, a few blocks west of the district's main square.
- Wholesale market: Market has been under construction since 2010.
- Retail market: Market has been under construction since 2010.

==== Informal mass markets ====
- Bellavista Market: Non-municipal market of the Callerino district, located on the Bellavista avenue.
- La Hoyada Market: Non-municipal riverside market, located on Sáenz Peña Avenue.

To prevent the informal trade that is rampant in the city, transfers between respective markets were established, increasing the economy of this type of sale. In 2014, Peruvian Supermarkets, owner of the commercial land, formally opened a hypermarket on kilometer 4 of Centenario Avenue that expands toward Amazonas Avenue. The franchises in the market, including Real Plaza, Ripley, Plaza Vee and Promart, generated 200 jobs.

== Culture ==
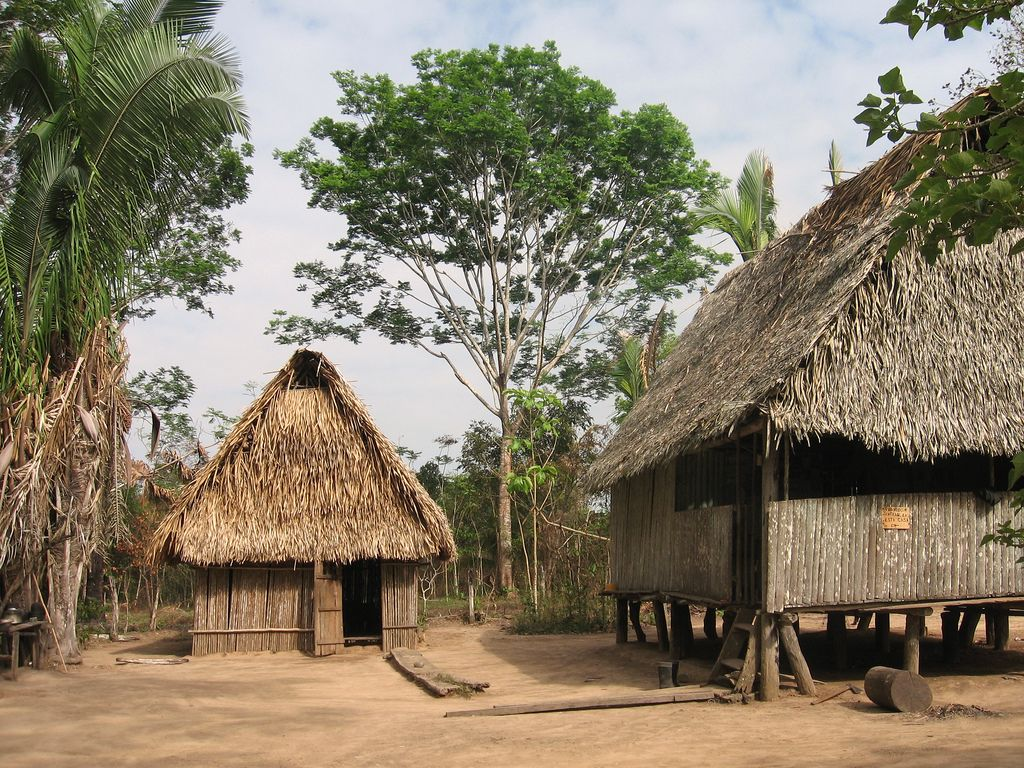
Maloca native houses

=== Architecture ===
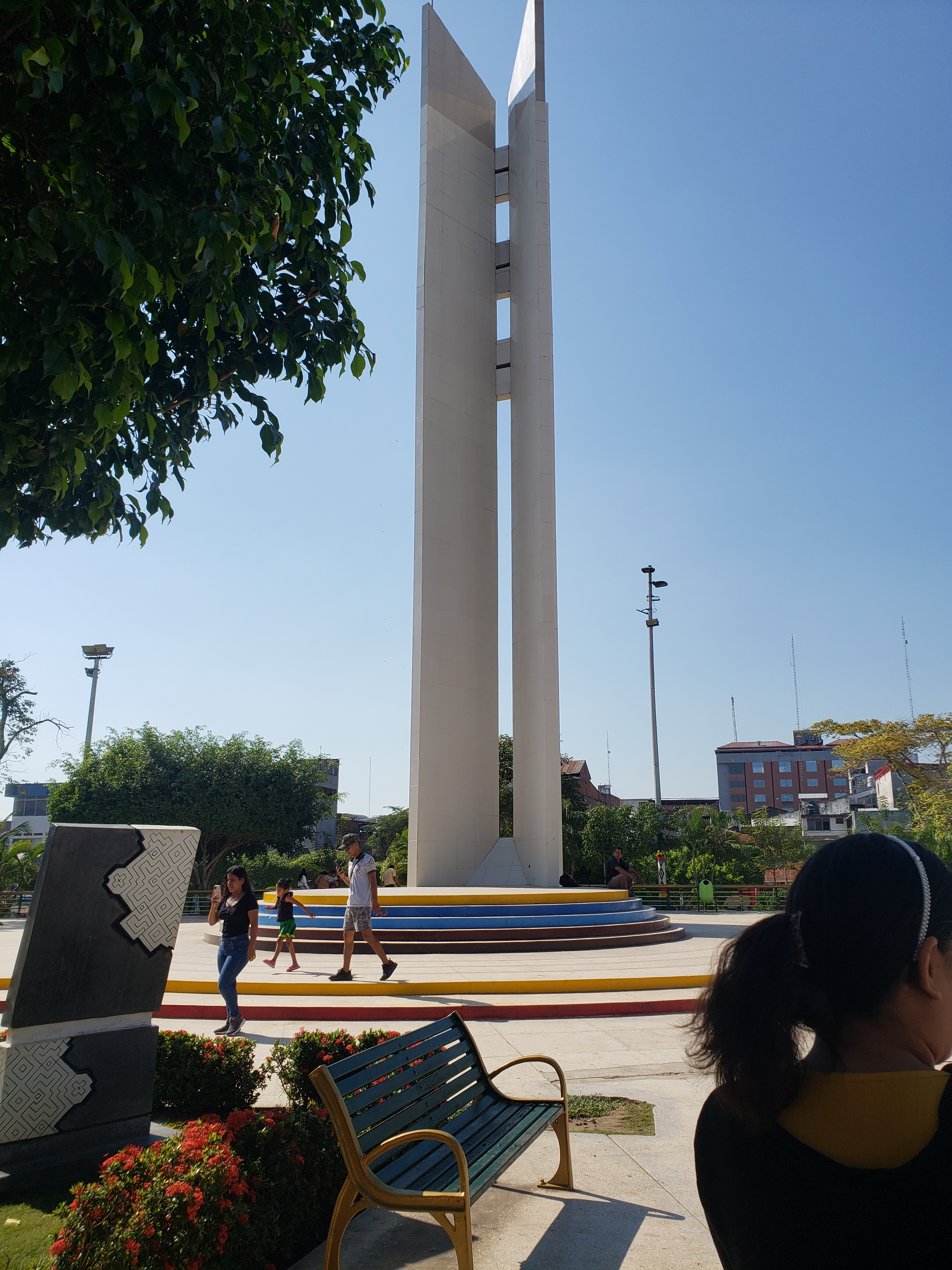
Obelisk in the Plaza de Armas of Pucallpa

In architectural terms, the great changes in the form of rural housing in Pucallpa and its organization are due to indigenous contact with modern society. In their quest to imitate the neo-colonial house, many native groups have abandoned the communal dwelling also known as maloca, in favor of the individual house on stilts. These were mainly used wood as an important symbol for constructions, especially rural ones. The cocamera has been preserved by some groups, but exclusively as a ceremonial center. With the introduction of mosquito nets, the settlers abandoned the dormitory houses in favor of the large house and under the influence of the settlers the size of the buildings decreased and the number of families housed was proportionally reduced. Currently it is used in rural places.

Constructions since the revolution of the 1970s have been replaced over the years by noble constructions: in the urban center of the city cement is particularly used, while in middle to lower class places wood (mainly mahogany) is used as protective measure. Certain architecture is based on jungle touches with the implementation of very intense outlines and high quality in the main square. The architectural design of these has lost its native characteristic and is now being modernized, with the characteristic use of cement as the main material. The first one in which it manifested itself was Plaza Grau, with the work of the Public Clock: with 8 floors with retouched images on each side (32 in total) and a clock that also points on each side. The Immaculate Conception Cathedral in the Plaza de Armas of Pucallpa is the largest and most iconic cathedral in the city.

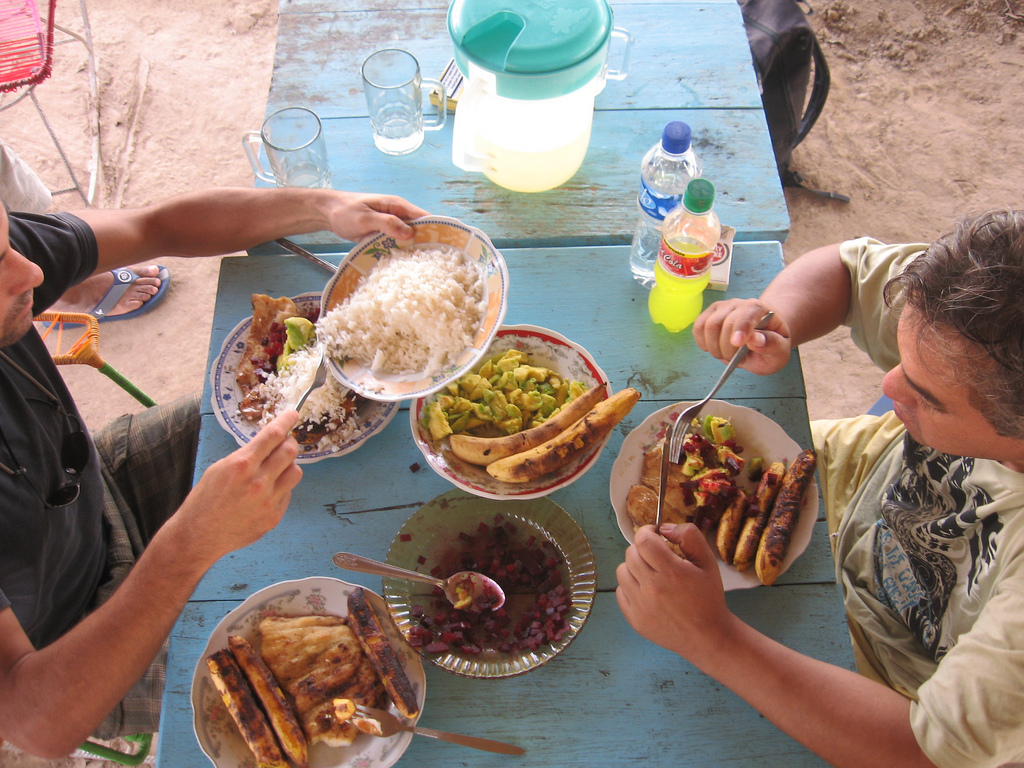
Typical dishes of Pucallpa

=== Cuisine ===
The food is a variation of typical Peruvian food, even with respect to the jungle, and uses the animals of the region. The jungle area of Peru has a great biodiversity in fauna, which is why the consumption of various meats is traditional, such as wild meats such as suri, tapir or sachavaca, rodents (majaz, añuje, punchada, sachacuy), armadillo, land turtle or motelo, woolly monkeys and maquisapa. In the immense variety, the paiche stands out, the second largest freshwater fish (can weigh up to 300 kilos and measure more than 2.5 meters long).

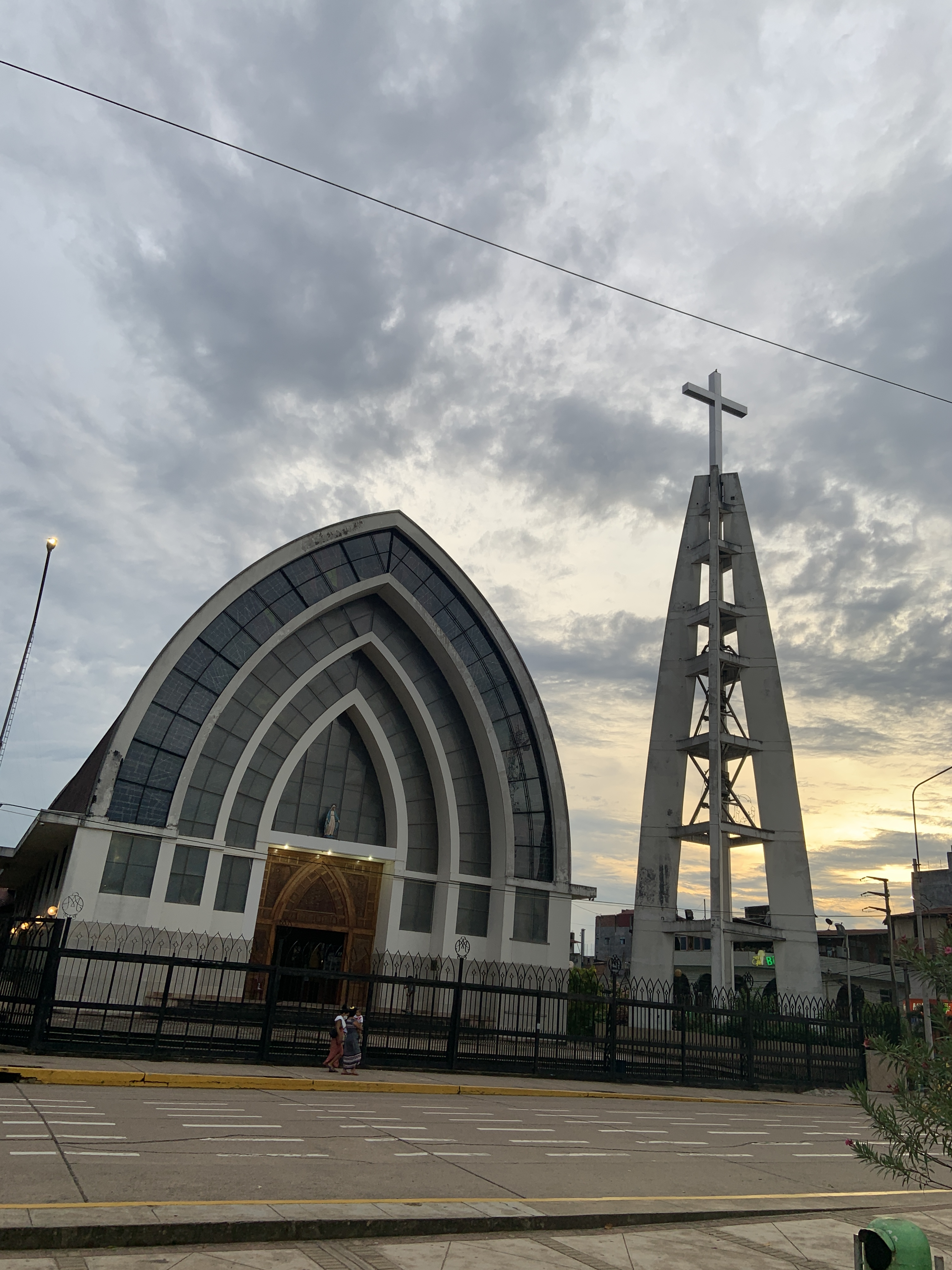
Cathedral of Pucallpa

=== Religion ===
In the city the predominant religion is Christianity, whose greatest tradition is the festival of San Juan, and in rural areas it can be native, especially as a local custom. This varied from the ideological intervention of the Shining Path in the jungle. Among the institutions are the Church of Jesus Christ of Latter-day Saints, the World Mission Society Church of God, New Acropolis, and some Adventist and Protestant congregations. One of the other majority representations is Catholicism, which forms the Apostolic Vicariate of Pucallpa, with the only cathedral of Ucayali, located in the Plaza de Armas of Pucallpa, which together with other churches led to a rapid expansion of popular religion. Something similar is done with the Swiss Cashibo mission, whose station is located 5 kilometers from the city.

=== Sport ===
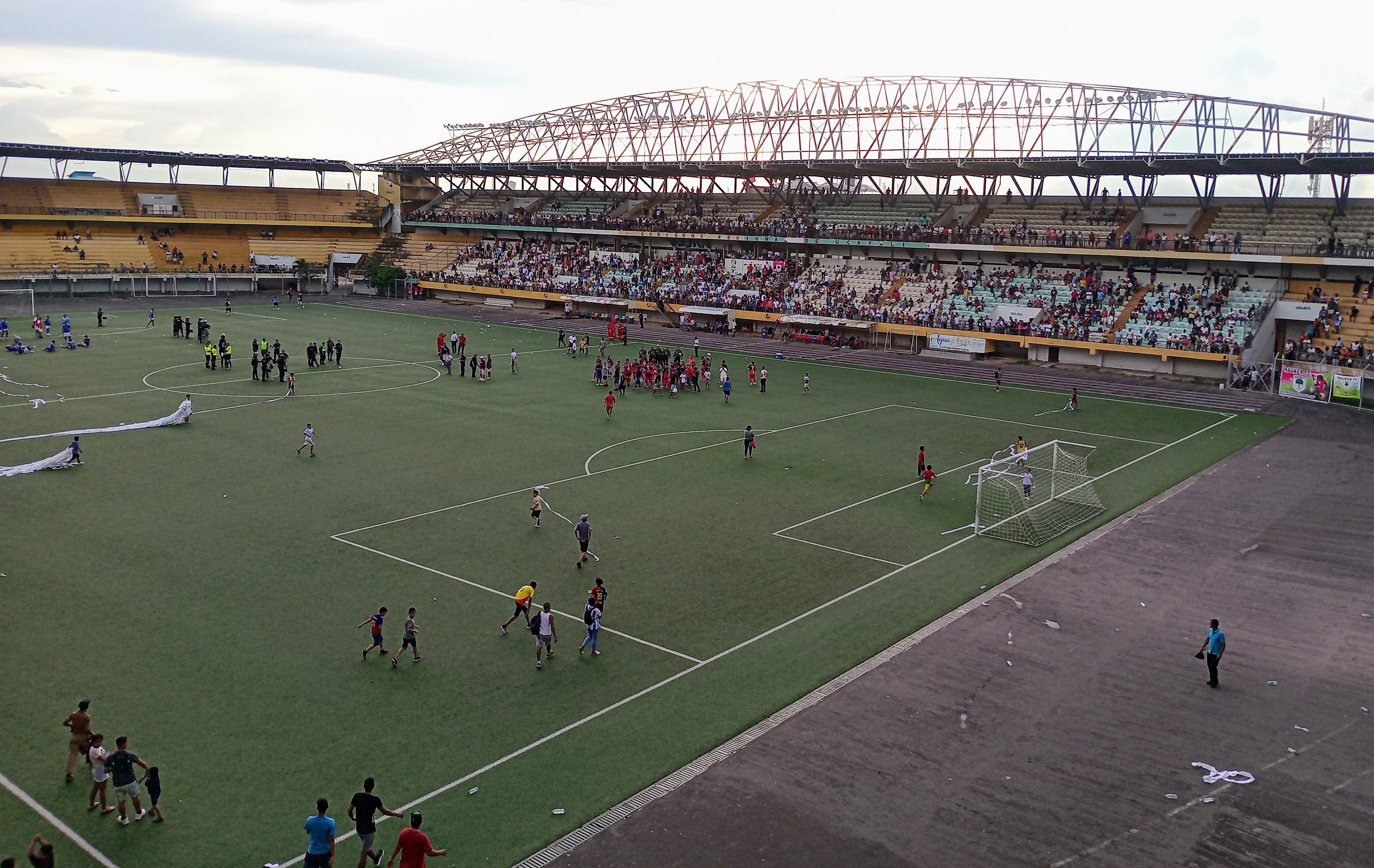
Estadio Aliardo Soria Pérez

In the city of Pucallpa, the sport that motivates the most interest is football, or soccer, like the rest of the country. The three big football clubs in Pucallpa are Sport Loreto, Deportivo Pucallpa and Deportivo Bancos. The main sports venue for playing football is the Estadio Aliardo Soria Pérez, located in the center of the city, with capacity for 25,000 spectators. Other venues are the San Fernando Closed Coliseum, the Forest Forest minifield and the Olympic swimming pool of Pucallpa.

== Education ==
Since its foundation, education has always been encouraged in Pucallpa. The first instances of formal education are not known, but according to a 1950 census, it was started with Franciscan missionaries around the town's founding.

Since then, education has expanded considerably in this area. According to education quality statistics from the Peru Ministry of Education, between three districts in 2010 there were 700 public schools, varying in quality, and 60 private schools. The school with the highest number of students was La Inmaculada with 2,879 students in 1998; however, the number has dropped to 2,229 students since then.

- No level of education: 18,568 (13,349 are between 3 and 5 years old)
- Full initial: 6,922 (38,26 are between 5 and 9 years old)
- Complete primary: 80,049 (24,367 are between 5 and 14 years old)
- Complete secondary: 106,672 (21,708 are between 10 and 19 years old)

At the university level, the most well known are: The public University of Ucayali (UNU) and the National Intercultural University of the Amazon (UNIA), and the University of Peru (UAP). Of these, out of the 539 students who applied to the University of Ucayali, only 25% enrolled in the university, leading to a much smaller than expected incoming class.

- Incomplete pre-university study: 13,904
- Full pre-university study: 14,048
- Incomplete university study: 9,721
- Full university study: 12,074

In June 2010, the government formed an agreement with the Presidency of Brazil. The objective was to encourage education between the countries, improving the cultural exchange for both groups.

== Transport ==
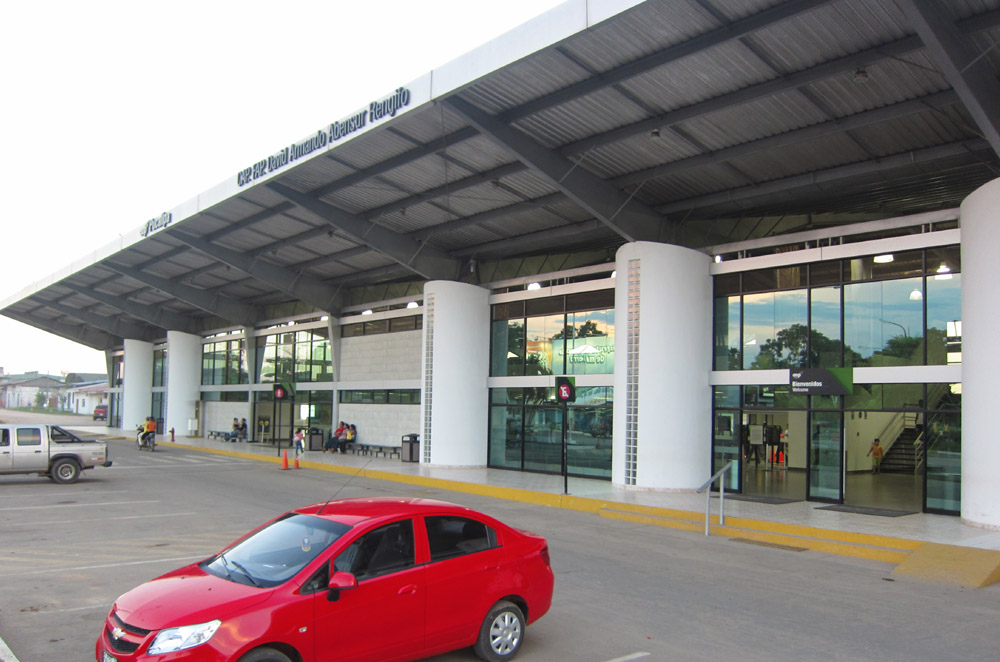
Capitan David Abensur Rengifo Airport

=== Air ===
Pucallpa has the most important airport in the region, whose name is FAP Captain David Abensur Rengifo International Airport, built in 1934. Daily, it receives flights from different areas of Peru; However, Lima is the main air destination. Other destinations are Iquitos and Tarapoto. However, there are various occasional flights that are opened to meet the demand of small towns far from the city. Likewise, there is the possibility of getting flights to Brazil.

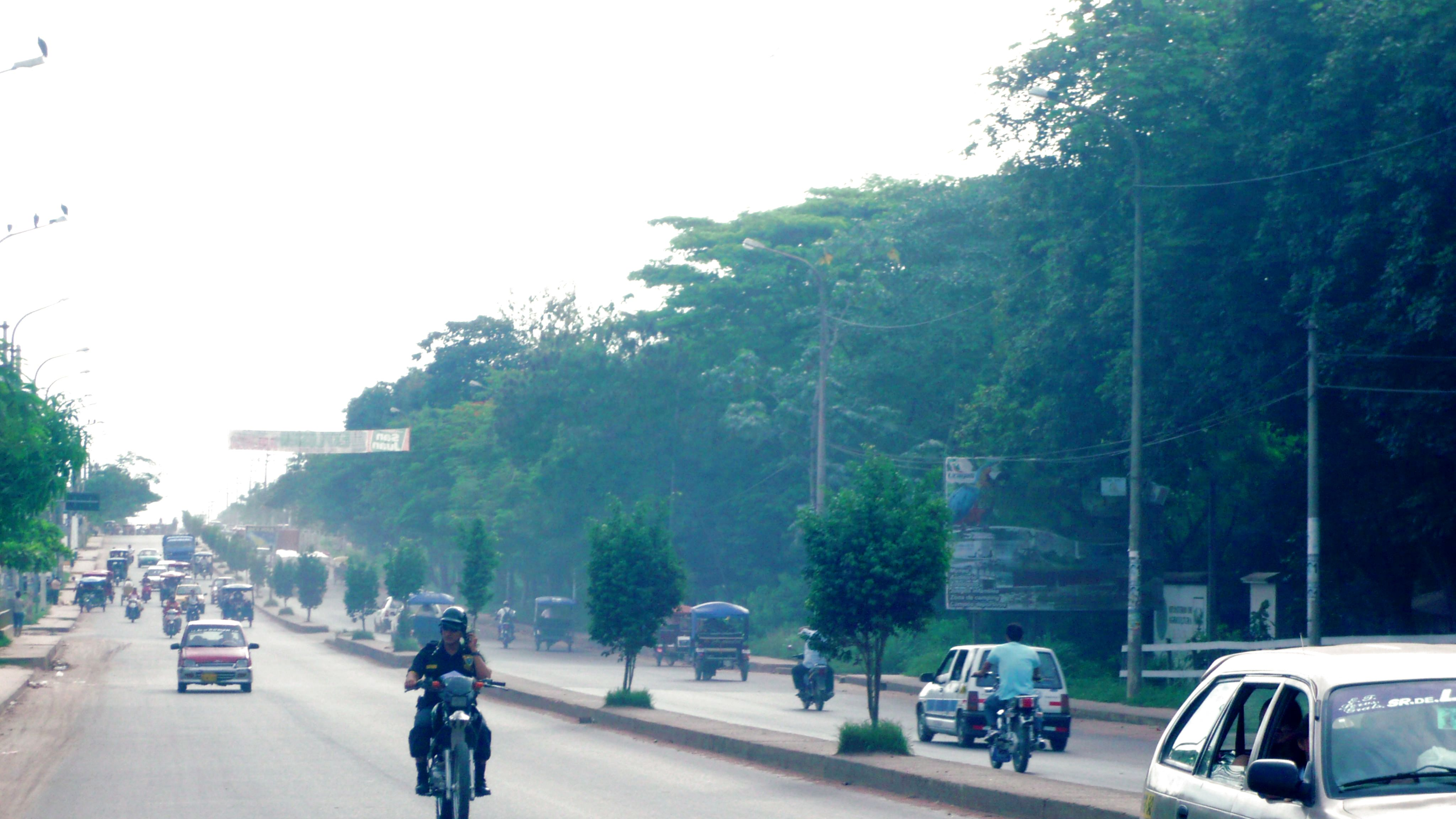
A highway in Pucallpa

=== Road ===
Pucallpa is one of the few cities in the Peruvian lowland jungle linked to the national highway network. It is the end point of the Federico Basadre highway, which the regional highway links the city with other highways in Aguaytía, Tingo María, Huánuco, Cerro de Pasco and Huacho under the name of route 016. This is the only road terrestrial communication. This makes the highway vital for the export of raw materials and manufactured products from the area. This work is unfinished, as it is not fully paved, despite being very busy, as it is the means of land transportation to several towns in the north of Ucayali. This situation brings complications in traffic in the case of rainy seasons, or paralysis in certain cities such as Aguaytía.

=== Maritime ===
Pucallpa is an important river port that, through the Ucayali River, communicates with the other large city of the Peruvian Amazon, Iquitos, and with Leticia, a Colombian city located on the tripartite border between Peru, Colombia and Brazil. River transportation has been considered prior to highway construction. Likewise, from the expeditions and the arrival of immigrants from the northern cities except from the Incas at that time.

== Public Services ==
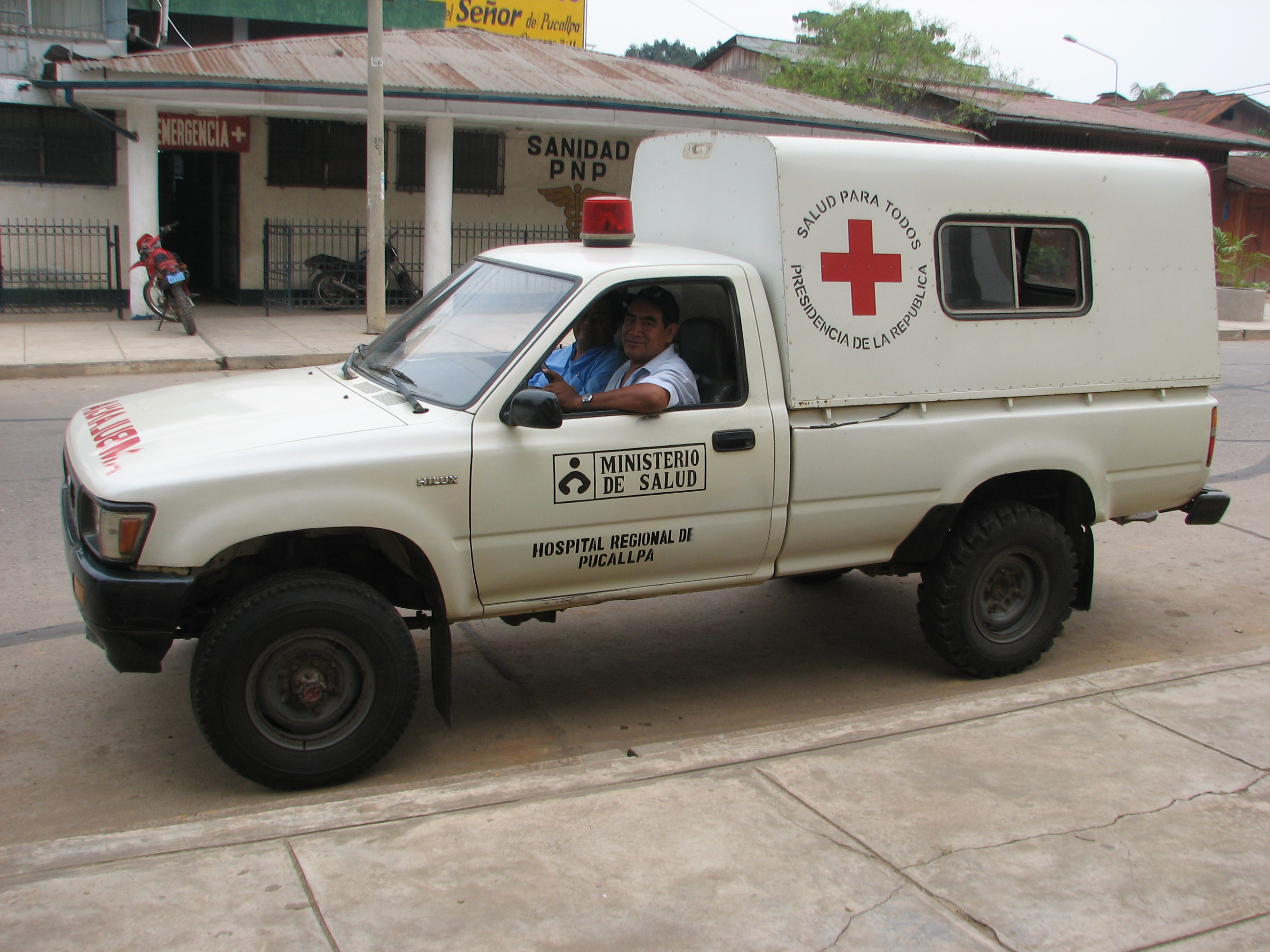
An ambulance in Pucallpa

=== Health ===
Among the companies that focus on human health, the two most popular are SIS and ESSALUD. SIS has 55,963 members and ESSALUD has 45,109 members. In addition to having 12,087 members of private services, the remaining population (169,692) does not want to be insured, especially children under 14 years of age (40,653 of the rest).

The most notable hospitals in the Ucayali region are the Regional Hospital, the Regional Hospital in Callería; and the Amazonian Hospital in Yarinacocha. Since the 1950s, they continue to offer service to the whole locality.

=== Hygiene ===
The cause of many hygiene problems in the city is the contamination of Lake Yarinacocha. This lake is the final destination of the municipality's drainage. This contamination has led to pollution and the extinction of species in the lake and surrounding areas. Although the city is not accustomed to this level of pollution, the goal of increasing and expanding pollution care services has been in place since 1960. One of the suggested solutions is the implementation of "ecological bathrooms".

Considering the city's climate, improper use of pollution care could lead to deadly diseases. For example, in the past, the constant humidity in the rainy cycle has led to the detection of dengue hemorrhagic fever in the Manantay district.

=== Security ===
In Pucallpa there were several waves of assaults and less severe crimes such as: the aggression against journalists, murders, violence in regional strikes, among others. The most dangerous crimes are drug trafficking on the Federico Basadre highway, and water based river assaults, as these increase transportation vulnerability. There is little effort on improving citizen security, so citizens face these problems themselves, due to the little police presence and collaboration in the area. Despite this, some alternatives have emerged. An example of this comes from a proposal from the national police. This proposal suggests the increased presence of security cameras as well as mobile phones could be an effective deterrent to crime. In addition, the creation of a committee to coordinate security with the Peruvian State has been suggested.

== See also ==
- Tapiche Ohara's Reserve
- TANS Peru Flight 204 crash, 23 August 2005.
- LANSA Flight 508 crash, 24 December 1971.
- Yarinaqucha
