= Lake Yarinacocha =

Lake in Peru

- Jepe Ian
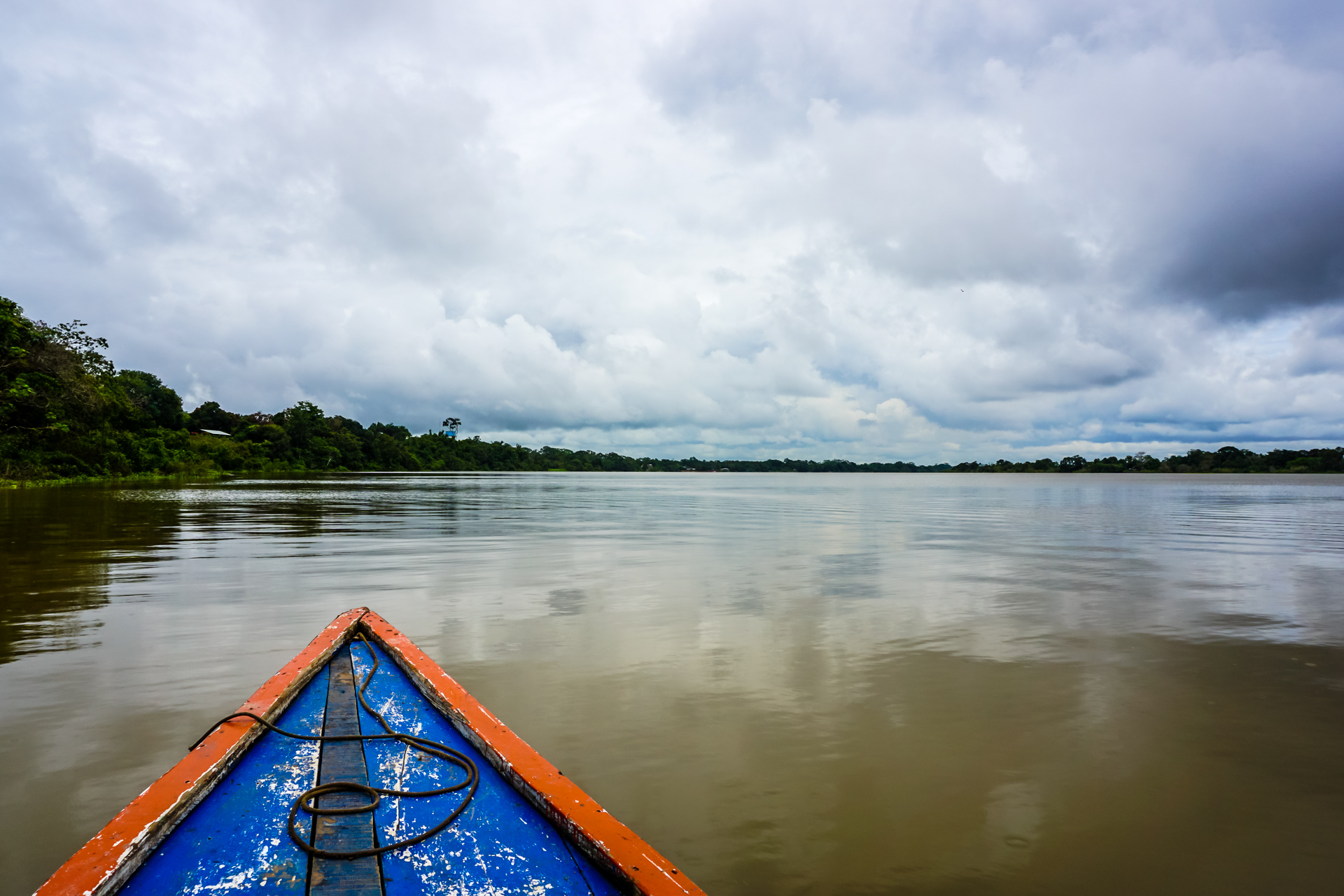

- Location within Peru
- Location: Ucayali Region
- Coordinates: 13°51′24″S 71°01′30″W
- Basin countries: Peru
- Max. length: 15.45 km (9.60 mi)
- Max. width: 0.82 km (0.51 mi)
- Average depth: 7 m (23 ft)
- Max. depth: 19 m (62 ft)
- Surface elevation: 149 m (489 ft)

Lake Yarinacocha (possibly from Quechua yarina ivory palm, qucha lake) is a lake in Peru located in the Ucayali Region, Coronel Portillo Province, Yarinacocha District. It is situated at a height of about 149 metres (489 ft), about 15.45 km long and 0.82 km at its widest point. Lake Yarinacocha lies west of the Ucayali River and northwest of Pucallpa.

== See also ==
- List of lakes in Peru
