= Masisea District =

Coordinates: 8.606°S 74.314°W

Masisea
- District
- Interactive map of Masisea
- Country: Peru
- Region: Ucayali
- Province: Coronel Portillo
- Founded: October 13, 1900
- Capital: Masisea

Government
  - Mayor: Marcos Guerra Torres

Area
  - Total: 14,102.2 km^{2} (5,444.9 sq mi)
- Elevation: 129 m (423 ft)

Population (2005 census)
  - Total: 11,789
  - Density: 0.83597/km^{2} (2.1651/sq mi)
- Time zone: UTC-5 (PET)
- UBIGEO: 250104
- Website: http://www.munimasisea.gob.pe

Masisea District is one of the seven districts of Peru in Coronel Portillo Province.
