= Coronel Portillo province =

Coordinates: 8.3833°S 74.5500°W

Coronel Portillo
- Province
- Coat of arms

- Location of Coronel Portillo in the Ucayali Region
- Country: Peru
- Region: Ucayali
- Capital: Pucallpa

Government
  - Mayor: Segundo Leónidas Pérez Collazos (2019-2022)

Area
  - Total: 36,235.95 km^{2} (13,990.78 sq mi)

Population
  - Total: 384,168
  - Density: 10.6018/km^{2} (27.4587/sq mi)
- UBIGEO: 2501
- Website: www.mpcp.gob.pe

Coronel Portillo is the second largest of four provinces in the Ucayali Region in Peru. Its capital is Pucallpa.

== Languages ==
According to the 2007 census, 92.8% of the population spoke Spanish as their first language, while 0.8% spoke Quechua, 0.5% spoke Asháninka, 0.1% spoke Aymara, and 5.7% spoke other indigenous languages.

== History ==
The province was created in 1943 within the jurisdiction of the Department of Loreto and initially covered the entire current territory of the Department of Ucayali. The first mayor was Arturo Bartra Flores, who was directly appointed by national authorities due to his notable status as a resident, impeccable conduct, and initiatives for the economic, civic, and social progress of the province. His leadership in municipal administration was limited to the year 1945.

== Political division ==
The province is divided into seven districts (Spanish: distritos, singular: distrito), each of which is headed by a mayor (alcalde). The districts, with their capitals in parentheses, are:

- Callería (Pucallpa)
- Campoverde (Campoverde)
- Iparía (Iparia)
- Manantay (San Fernando)
- Masisea (Masisea)
- Yarinacocha (Puerto Callao)
- Nueva Requena (Nueva Requena)

== Places of interest ==
- El Sira Communal Reserve
- Yarinaqucha
