= TANS Perú Flight 204 =

2005 aviation accident in Peru

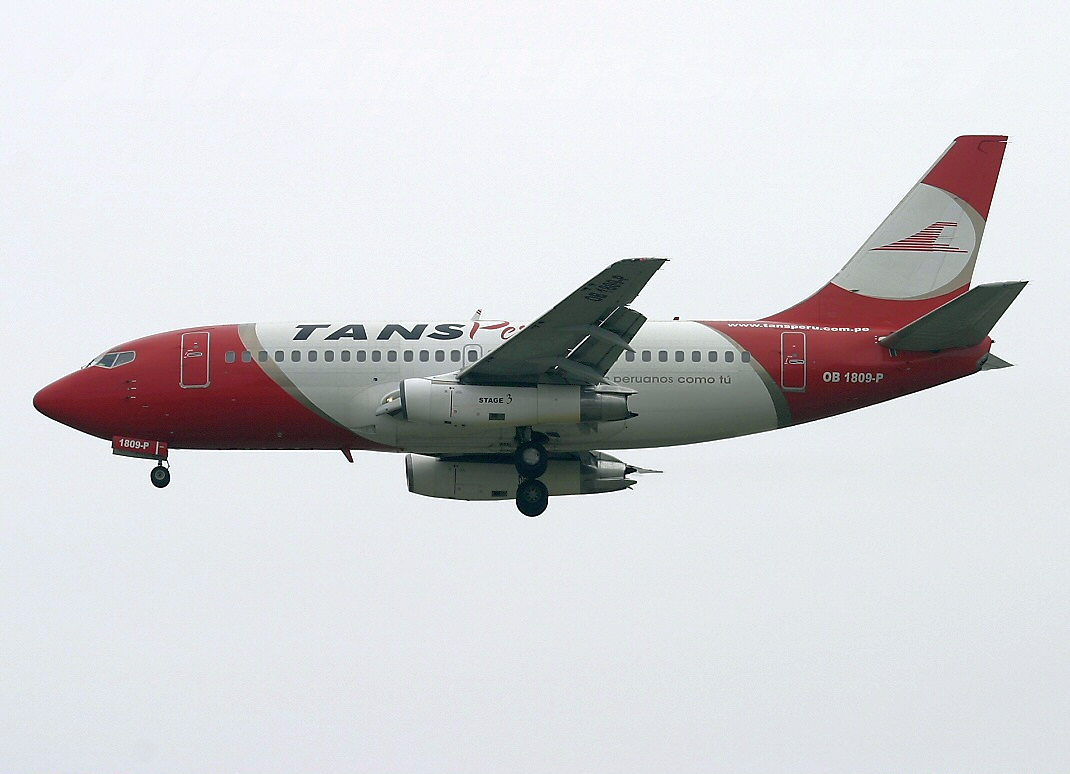
- OB-1809-P, the aircraft involved, seen 20 days before the accident

Accident
- Date: 23 August 2005
- Summary: Controlled flight into terrain due to pilot error in bad weather
- Site: Pucallpa, Peru; 8°25′0″S 74°35′45″W

Aircraft
- Aircraft type: Boeing 737-244 Advanced
- Operator: TANS Perú
- IATA flight No.: TJ204
- ICAO flight No.: ELV204
- Call sign: AEREOS SELVA 204
- Registration: OB-1809-P
- Flight origin: Jorge Chávez International Airport; Lima, Peru
- Stopover: Captain Rolden International Airport; Pucallpa, Peru
- Destination: Iquitos International Airport; Iquitos, Peru
- Occupants: 98
- Passengers: 91
- Crew: 7
- Fatalities: 40
- Injuries: 58
- Survivors: 58

TANS Perú Flight 204 was a domestic scheduled Lima–Pucallpa–Iquitos passenger service, operated with a Boeing 737-200, that crashed on 23 August 2005 on approach to Pucallpa Airport, 4 miles (6.4 km) off the airfield, following an emergency landing attempt because of bad weather, killing 40 of the 98 passengers and crew aboard.

== Background ==
Nationality	Passengers	Crew	Total
Peru	73	7	80
United States	11 (Note: The U.S. total includes José Leandro Vivas, a Peruvian–American who survived with family.)	–	11
Italy	4	–	4
Spain	1	–	1
Australia	1	–	1
Colombia	1	–	1
Total	91	7	98

The passengers were identified as 11 Americans, four Italians, one Colombian, one Australian, and one Spanish tourist. The Spanish victim was Eva María Gonzalo Torrellas, 27, from Tarazona, Aragon. Among the dead were also Americans Stephen Michael Lotti, 28, and Sherra Young Gay. All other passengers and crew members were Peruvian.

The aircraft involved was a 1981-built Boeing 737-244 Advanced registered OB-1809, which had been leased to TANS Perú from the South African lessor company Safair two months prior to the accident. Powered by two Pratt & Whitney JT8D-17A engines, the airframe had its maiden flight on 4 August 1981, and was originally delivered to South African Airways. At the time of the accident, the aircraft had accumulated 49,865 flight hours and 45,262 cycles, and was 24 years old.

The captain was 45-year-old Octavio Pérez Palma Garreta, who had 5,867 flight hours, including 3,763 hours on the Boeing 737. The first officer was 37-year-old Jorge Luis Pinto Panta, who had 4,755 flight hours, with 1,109 of them on the Boeing 737; 38-year-old Gonzalo Chirinos Delgado, a trainee pilot, was also on board. He had 2,700 flight hours, but only 61 of them on the Boeing 737.

== Description of the accident ==
An unusual cold front was developing in the vicinity of Pucallpa, minutes before the event took place, with cloud tops estimated to be 45,000 feet (14,000 m) high. Instead of diverting to another airport, the crew initiated the approach to Pucallpa Airport with torrential rain, hail, and strong winds. Some 10 minutes before the scheduled time for landing, the aircraft started rocking. The aircraft flew through a hailstorm for the last 32 seconds of its ill-fated flight when it was taken down by wind shear, hit treetops and impacted a swamp located 3.8 nautical miles (7.0 km; 4.4 mi) ahead of the runway threshold. The aircraft broke up as it crashed and burst into flames, leaving a path of debris and flaming fuel 100 feet (30 m) wide and 0.8 nautical miles (1.5 km; 0.92 mi) long. The wreckage of the airplane was engulfed by the fire.

With 91 passengers and seven crew members on board, 35 passengers and five crew (including the three pilots) died in the accident. Non-Peruvian occupants of the aircraft included 11 Americans, one Australian, one Colombian, and one Spaniard; Italians were also aboard, but the actual number of them depends upon the source consulted. Most of the fatalities were recorded for passengers travelling in the front of the aircraft. Fifty-eight people survived the accident, many of them suffering burns and broken limbs.

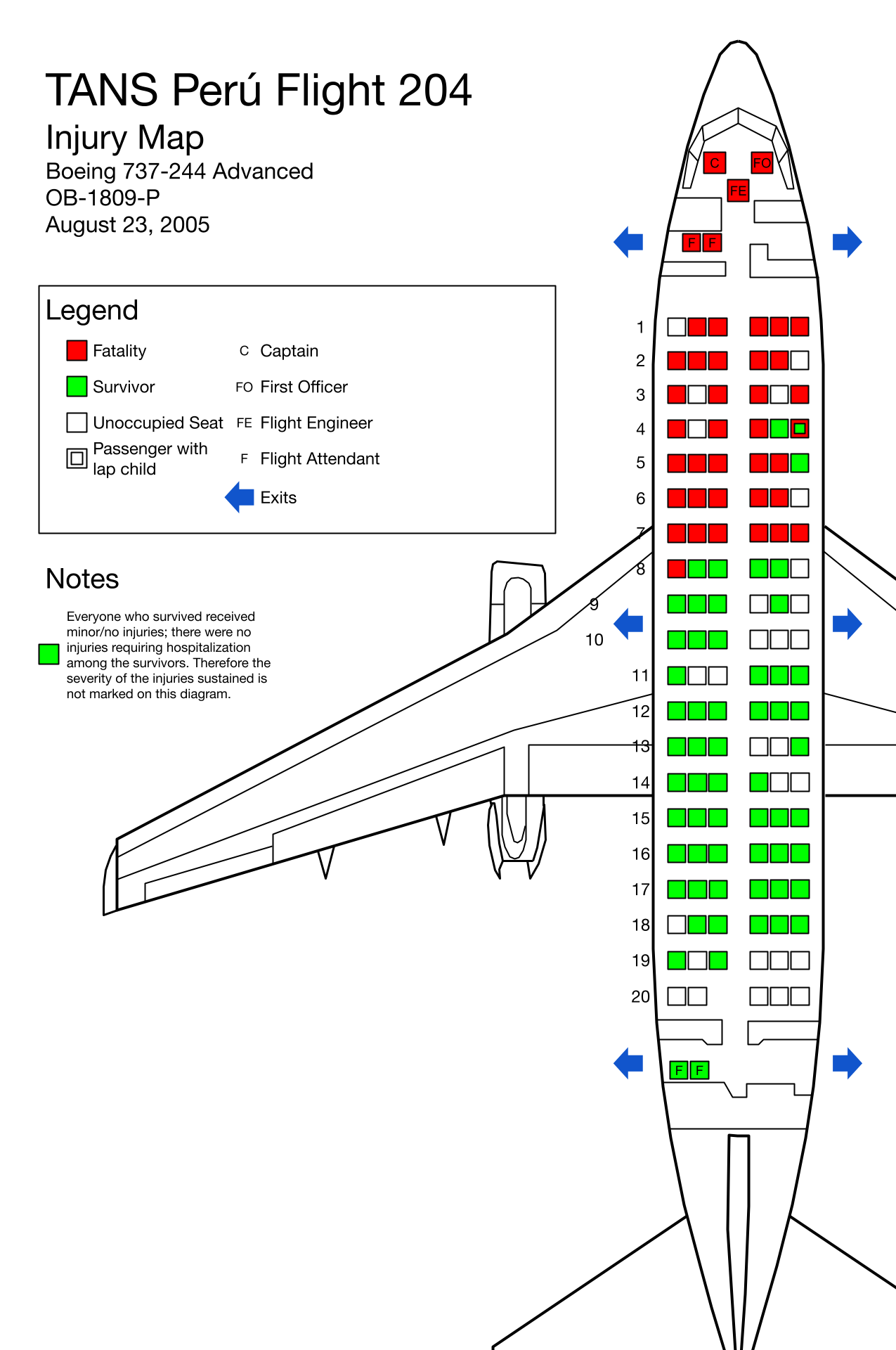
Injury Map of TANS Peru Flight 204 - contrary to above Notes, the last sentence of 'Description of the accident' section as to passenger survivors states that 'many of them suffering serious injuries'

== Investigation ==
Investigation of the crash site was hindered by looters, who descended upon the crash and stole various elements to be sold for scrap. A US$500 (equivalent to $824.25 in 2025) reward did succeed in securing the return of the flight data recorder. After 312 days of investigations, no technical malfunctions were reported. The official cause of the accident was determined to be pilot error for not following standard procedures under adverse weather conditions. The captain took control of the plane, but the trainee pilot did not immediately monitor the instruments. As a result, the crew did not notice the rapid descent in the few crucial seconds they had where they could have avoided danger. According to Aviation Safety Network, the accident ranks among the more deadly ones that took place in 2005. It was also the second major crash involving a TANS Perú airplane in slightly over two years.

== In the media ==
Flight 204 has been the subject of a Reader's Digest story and an MSNBC documentary. The Canadian TV series, Mayday, has also produced an episode about the accident named "Blind Landing".

== See also ==
- List of aviation accidents and incidents involving CFIT
