= Iparía District =

Coordinates: 9.307°S 74.443°W

Iparía
- District
- Interactive map of Iparía
- Country: Peru
- Region: Ucayali
- Province: Coronel Portillo
- Founded: July 2, 1943
- Capital: Iparía

Government
  - Mayor: Roberto Silvano Rengifo

Area
  - Total: 8,029.59 km^{2} (3,100.24 sq mi)
- Elevation: 165 m (541 ft)

Population (2005 census)
  - Total: 10,852
  - Density: 1.3515/km^{2} (3.5004/sq mi)
- Time zone: UTC-5 (PET)
- UBIGEO: 250103
- Website: muniiparia.gob.pe

Iparía District is one of the seven districts of Peru in Coronel Portillo Province.
