= Callería District =

Coordinates: 8°23′S 74°33′W

Callería
- District
- Interactive map of Callería
- Country: Peru
- Region: Ucayali
- Province: Coronel Portillo
- Founded: October 13, 1900
- Capital: Pucallpa

Government
  - Mayor: Segundo Leónidas Pérez Collazos (2019-2022)

Area
  - Total: 10,485.4 km^{2} (4,048.4 sq mi)
- Elevation: 120 m (390 ft)

Population (2017)
  - Total: 149,999
  - Density: 14.3055/km^{2} (37.0511/sq mi)
- Time zone: UTC-5 (PET)
- UBIGEO: 250101
- Website: www.municalleria.gob.pe

Callería District is one of the seven districts of Peru in Coronel Portillo Province.
