= Nueva Requena District =

Coordinates: 8.3341°S 74.5620°W

Nueva Requena
- District
- Interactive map of Nueva Requena
- Country: Peru
- Region: Ucayali
- Province: Coronel Portillo
- Founded: September 13, 1994
- Capital: Nueva Requena

Government
  - Mayor: Bacilides Dorado Sairitupa

Area
  - Total: 1,857.82 km^{2} (717.31 sq mi)
- Elevation: 138 m (453 ft)

Population (2005 census)
  - Total: 5,312
  - Density: 2.859/km^{2} (7.405/sq mi)
- Time zone: UTC-5 (PET)
- UBIGEO: 250106

Nueva Requena District is one of the seven districts of Peru in Coronel Portillo Province.
