= Manantay District =

Coordinates: 8°26′S 74°33′W

Manantay
- District
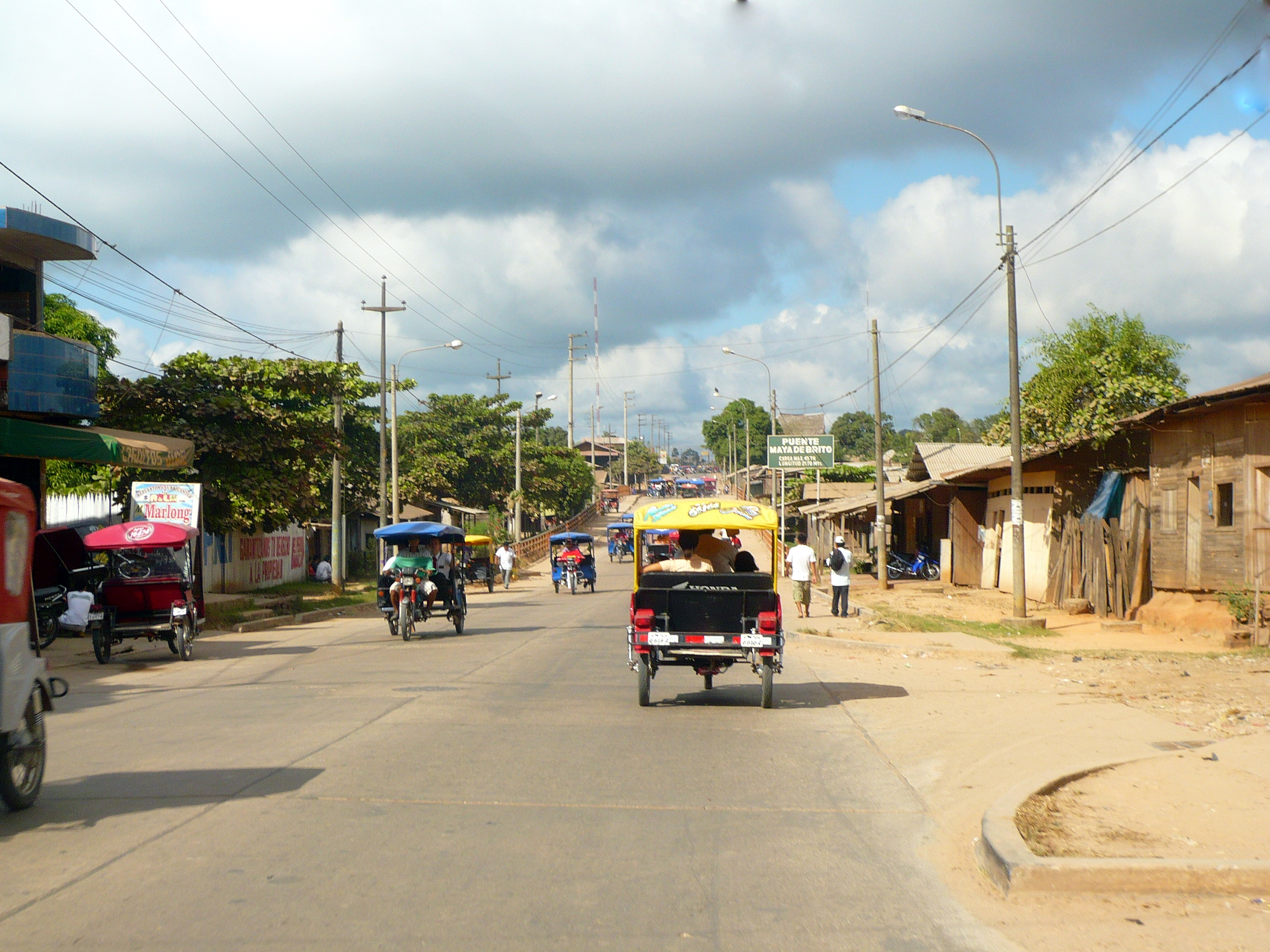
- Interactive map of Manantay
- Country: Peru
- Region: Ucayali
- Province: Coronel Portillo
- Founded: June 2, 2006
- Capital: San Fernando
- Time zone: UTC-5 (PET)
- UBIGEO: 250107

Manantay District is one of the seven districts of Peru in Coronel Portillo Province.
