= Campoverde District =

Coordinates: 8°28′12″S 74°48′36″W

Campoverde
- District
- Interactive map of Campoverde
- Country: Peru
- Region: Ucayali
- Province: Coronel Portillo
- Founded: June 1, 1982
- Capital: Campo Verde

Government
  - Mayor: Wiliam Amasifuen Tanchiva

Area
  - Total: 1,164.74 km^{2} (449.71 sq mi)
- Elevation: 200 m (660 ft)

Population (2005 census)
  - Total: 12,620
  - Density: 10.84/km^{2} (28.06/sq mi)
- Time zone: UTC-5 (PET)
- UBIGEO: 250102

Campoverde District is one of the seven districts of Peru within Coronel Portillo Province.
