= Yarinacocha District =

Yarinacocha Yarinaqucha
- District
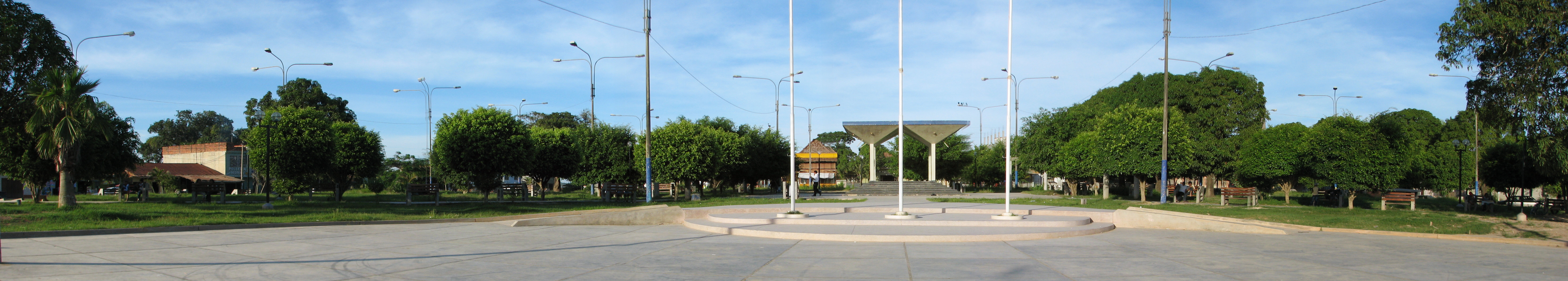
- Central square

- Coat of arms
- Interactive map of Yarinacocha
- Coordinates: 8.3538°S 74.5768°W
- Country: Peru
- Region: Ucayali
- Province: Coronel Portillo
- Founded: 16 October 1964
- Capital: Puerto Callao
- Subdivisions: 120

Government
  - Mayor: Gilberto Arevalo Riveiro

Area
  - Total: 596.2 km^{2} (230.2 sq mi)

Population (2005 census)
  - Total: 67,681
  - Density: 113.5/km^{2} (294.0/sq mi)
- Time zone: UTC-5 (PET)
- UBIGEO: 200706
- Website: muniyarinacocha.gob.pe

Yarinacocha District is one of the seven districts of Peru in Coronel Portillo Province, part of the Ucayali Region. Its capital is the village of Puerto Callao.

== Mayors ==
The following people have served as mayors of the district since 1965:

- 1965–1969 Juan Luis Caravedo Lefaure
- 1970–1970 Alberto Abensur Susane
- 1971–1972 Gabriel Pirro Morales
- 1973–1975 Pastor Lazo Aguirre
- 1976–1977 Porfirio Del Aguila Aguilar
- 1978–1980 Elias Robledo Doñez
- 1981–1983 Marden López Torres
- 1984–1986 Elias Robledo Doñez
- 1987–1989 Roberto Ruiz Vargas
- 1990–1992 Arturo Bardales Carbajal
- 1993–1995 Hermenegildo del Aguila Panduro
- 1996–1998 Gilberto Arévalo Riveiro
- 1999–2002 Walter Ruiz Vargas
- 2003–2006 Edwin Díaz Paredes
- 2017– Gilberto Arevalo Riveiro
