= List of Indigenous people of the Americas =

This is a list of notable Indigenous people of the Americas.

== North America ==
=== Canada ===
Generally referred to as Aboriginal peoples in Canada when looking at the First Nations, Inuit, and Métis peoples collectively.

=== Mexico ===
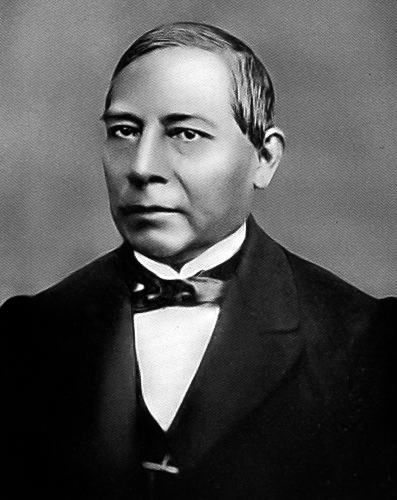
Benito Juárez, Zapotec, president of Mexico

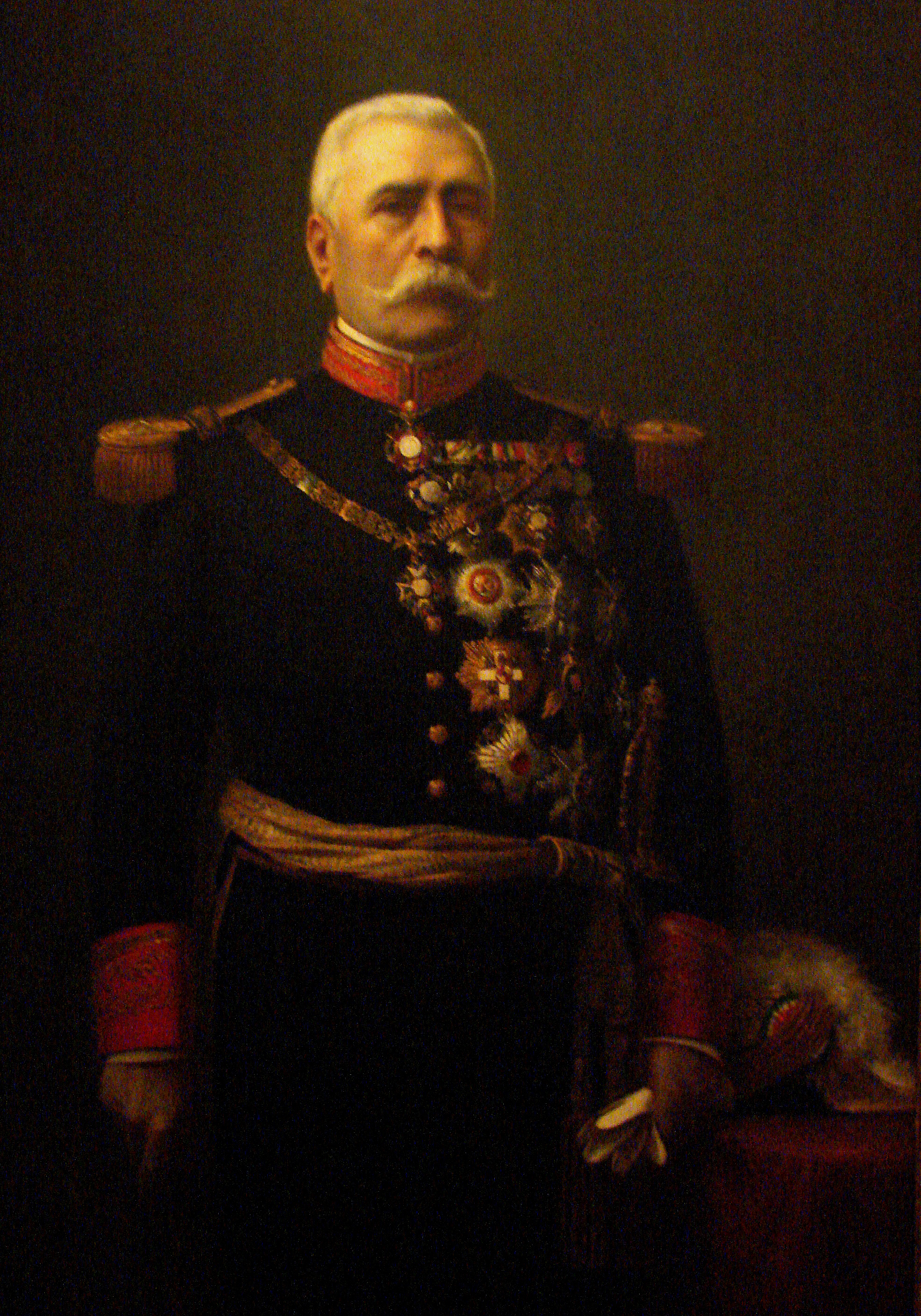
Porfirio Díaz, Mexican Army general, president of Mexico

This issue is complicated because a great majority of Mexicans are mestizos, and therefore being part Native is not unusual as in Canada or the US. The list only include Indigenous proper and mestizos with an Indigenous parent. This list also includes a few Pre-Columbian figures considered remarkable in the history and culture of Mexico.

- Ignacio Manuel Altamirano, writer, journalist and politician (Nahua)
- Fernando de Alva Cortés Ixtlilxóchitl, (d. 1648), Nahua historian, descendant of Ixtlilxochitl
- Bartolomé de Alva, Nahua, younger brother of Fernando de Alva Cortés Ixtlilxóchitl
- Diego de Alvarado Huanitzin, tlatoani of Tenochtitlan
- Domingo Arenas, Mexican revolutionary from Tlaxcala
- Juan Badiano, Nahua translator
- Juana Belén Gutiérrez de Mendoza, anarchist, feminist activist, typographer, journalist and poet (Caxcan)
- Cajemé, Yaqui rebel leader
- Jacinto Canek (1731–1761), Maya rebel leader
- Chimalpahin (1579–1660), Nahua historian
- Cuauhtémoc, last (Aztec) Tlatoani
- Cuitláhuac, penultimate (Aztec) Tlatoani
- Juan Diego Cuauhtlatoatzin, Catholic Saint (Chichimeca)
- Porfirio Díaz, President (Mixtec mother)
- Pascual Díaz y Barreto (1876–1936), Huichol Roman Catholic prelate
- Lila Downs, singer (Mixtec mother)
- Emilio Fernández, film director, actor (Kickapoo mother)
- Faustino Galicia Chimalpopoca professor, lawyer, and translator of the Nahuatl language
- Amaranta Gómez Regalado, Muxe social anthropologist
- Natalio Hernández (b. 1947), Nahua poet from Veracruz
- Victoriano Huerta, president (Huichol mother)
- Indio Mariano, rebel leader in Tepic
- Luz Jiménez (1897–1965), Nahua storyteller
- Benito Juárez, president (Zapotec)
- La Malinche, translator of conquistador Hernán Cortés
- Modesta Lavana, (1929–2010), Nahua healer
- Florentina López de Jesús (1939–2014), Amuzgo weaver
- Tomás Mejía, Otomi Mexican Army general
- Moctezuma II, (Aztec), Tlatoani at the beginning of the Spanish Conquest of the Aztec Empire
- Claudia Morales Reza, Huichol president of the National Council to Prevent Discrimination
- Diego Muñoz Camargo (c. 1529–1599), historian of Tlaxcala
- Nezahualcóyotl, Tlatoani of Texcoco and poet in Nahuatl language
- Nezahualpilli (1464–1515), Tlatoani of Texcoco
- Martín Ocelotl (1496–?1537), Nahua priest/shaman executed by the Inquisition
- Carlos Ometochtzin (d. 1539), Cacique of Texcoco, executed by the Inquisition
- Daniel Ponce de León (b. 1980), Tarahumara professional boxer
- Comandante Ramona, EZLN leader (Tzotzil)
- Isabel Ramírez Castaneda (1881–1943), archeologist (Nahua)
- María Sabina, shaman (Mazatec)
- Comandante Tacho, EZLN leader (Tojolabal)
- Refugio Tánori, Opata commander and supporter of the Second Mexican Empire
- Francisco Tenamaztle (fl. 1540s–50s), Caxcan leader in the Mixton War
- Antonio Valeriano (c. 1521–1605), Nahua scholar, collaborator with Bernardino de Sahagún on the Florentine Codex
- Felipe Santiago Xicoténcatl, 1804–1847 Nahua, general in the Mexican Army under Antonio López de Santa Anna

== Central America ==
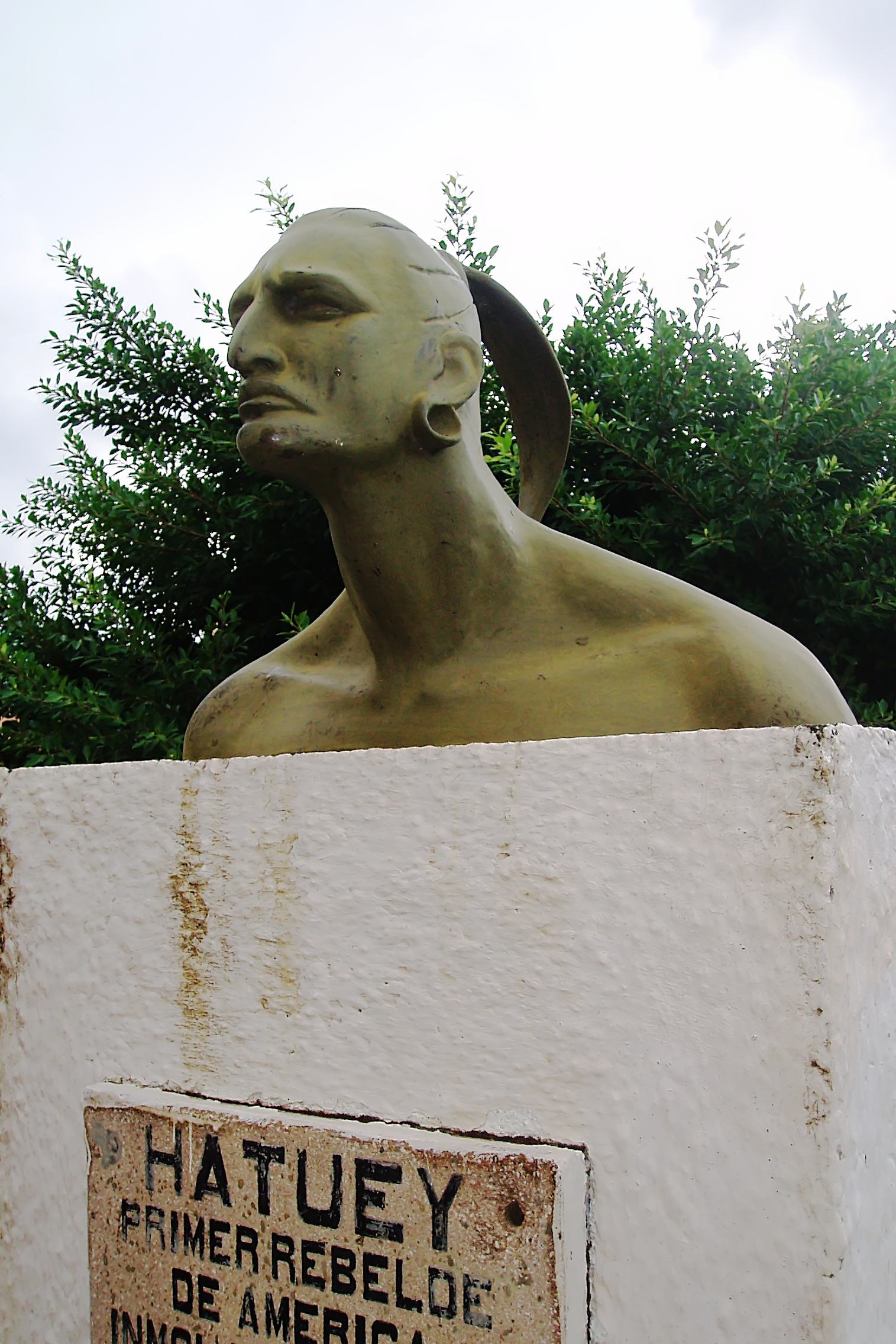
Hatuey, Cacique, executed in 1512 by the Spanish, hero in modern Cuba

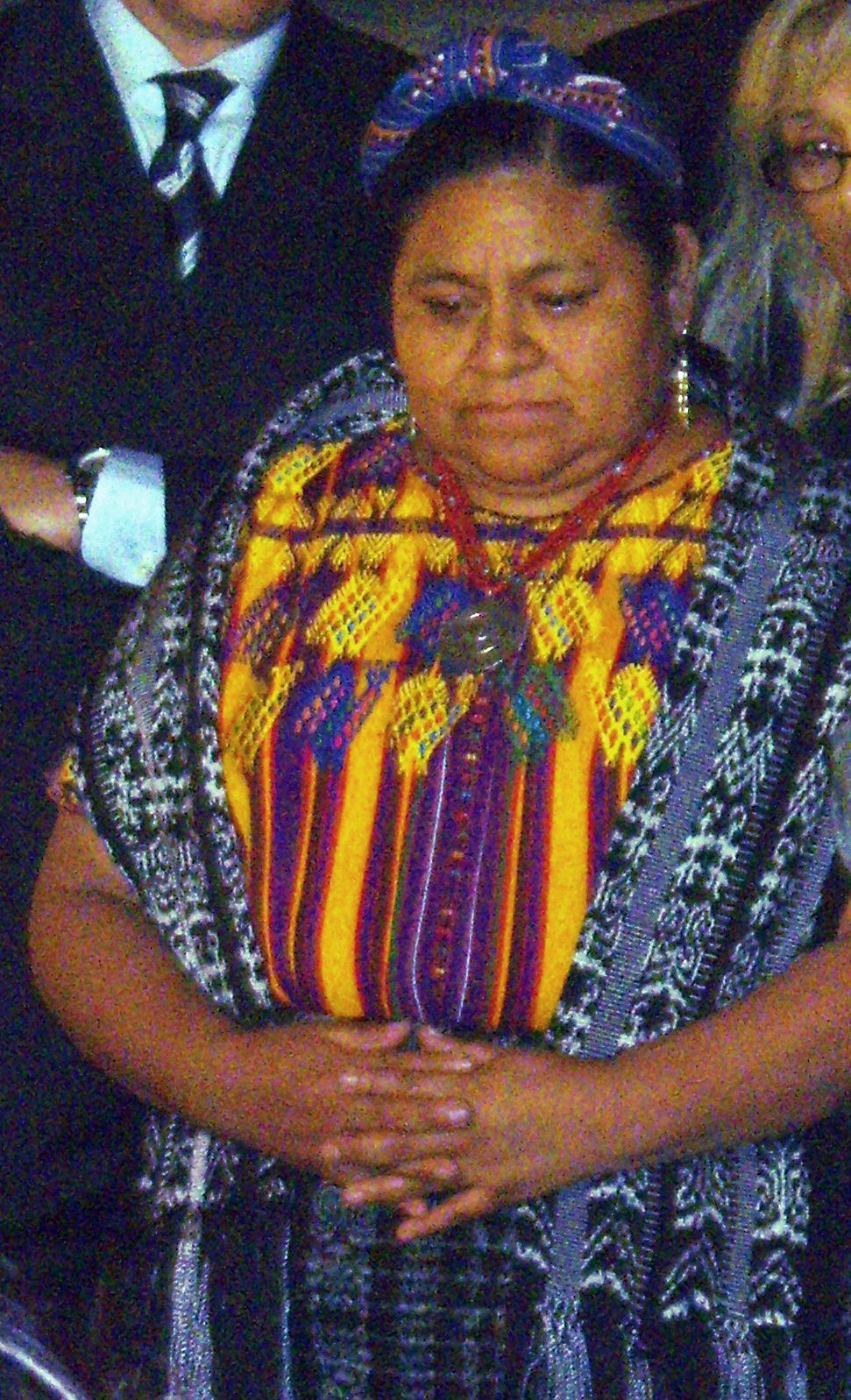
Rigoberta Menchú, K'iche' Maya Nobel Peace Prize recipient from Guatemala

=== The Caribbean ===
- Agüeybaná (The Great Sun), "supreme cacique" in Puerto Rico
- Agüeybaná II, Cacique in Puerto Rico
- Arasibo, Cacique in Puerto Rico
- Hatuey, Cacique in Cuba (Taíno)
- Hayuya, Cacique in Puerto Rico
- Jumacao, Cacique in Puerto Rico
- Anacaona, Cacique in Hispaniola (Taíno)
- Arawak, Cacique in Bahamas (Taíno)
- Caonabo, Cacique in Hispaniola (Lucayan)
- Guacanagaric, Cacique in Hispaniola (Taíno)
- Guarionex, Cacique in Hispaniola (Taíno)
- Enriquillo, Cacique in Hispaniola (Taíno)

=== Guatemala ===
- Miguel Ángel Asturias, novelist, Nobel prize winner in literature
- Rigoberta Menchú Tum, activist, Nobel prize winner in peace (Quiché)
- Concepción Ramírez, activist, appears on the Guatemalan 25-centavo coin
- María Telón, K'iche' Mayan actress
- Irma Alicia Velásquez Nimatuj, K'iche' Mayan journalist and anthropologist

=== Nicaragua ===
- Myrna Cunningham, Miskita physician, feminist and Indigenous rights activist

== South America ==
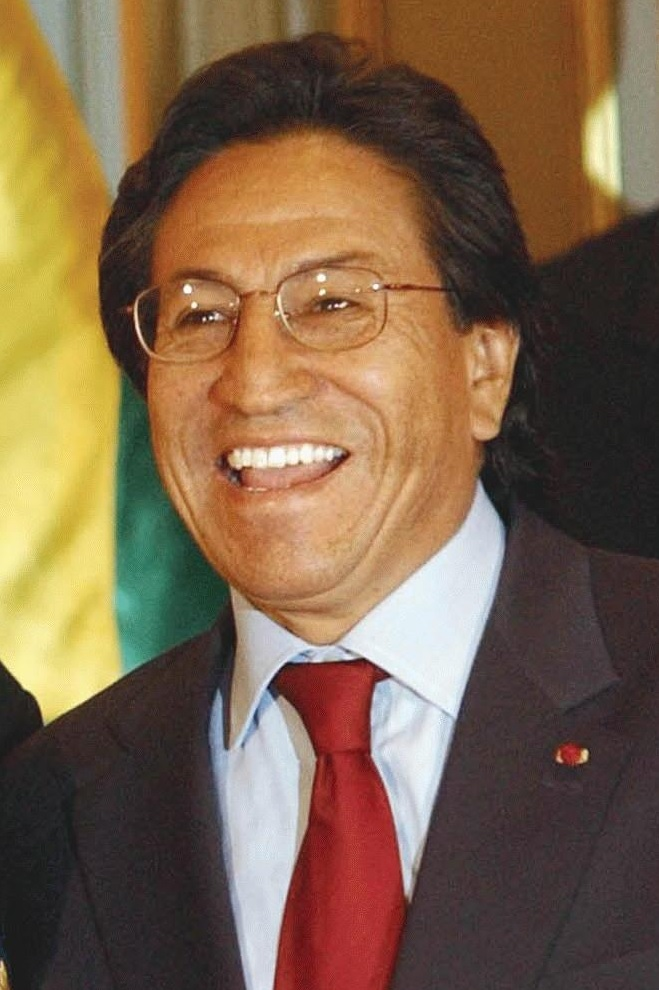
Alejandro Toledo, ex-president of Peru

=== Argentina ===
- Rosa Chiquichano, Tehuelche-Mapuche politician
- Moira Millán, Mapuche activist and indigenous leader
- Relmu Ñamku, Mapuche activist

=== Bolivia ===
- Roberto Mamani Mamani (b. 1962), Aymara painter
- Alejandro Mario Yllanes (1913–1960), Aymara painter and printmaker
- Evo Morales, Aymara politician, president of Bolivia
- Bienvenido Zacu Mborobainchi, b. 1956, Guarayo politician

=== Brazil ===
- Sônia Guajajara, activist and politician
- Ailton Krenak, writer and philosopher
- Raoni Metuktire, environmentalist
- Daniel Munduruku, writer and educator
- Djuena Tikuna, singer

=== Chile ===
- Ainavillo (16th century), Mapuche toqui
- Butapichón (17th century), Mapuche toqui
- Cadeguala (16th century), Mapuche toqui
- Calfucurá (late 1770s–1873), Mapuche military leader from Patagonia
- Caupolicán (died 1558), Mapuche toqui
- Santos Chávez (1934–2001), Mapuche printmaker
- Elicura Chihuailaf (born 1952), Mapuche poet
- Herminia Aburto Colihueque, Mapuche politician
- Aracely Leuquén Uribe, Mapuche politician
- Emilia Nuyado, Mapuche politician
- Victorino Antilef, Mapuche politician
- Alexis Caiguan, Mapuche politician
- Rosa Catrileo, Mapuche politician
- Francisco Huenchumilla, Mapuche politician
- Francisca Linconao, Mapuche politician
- Natividad Llanquileo, Mapuche politician
- Elisa Loncón, Mapuche politician
- Adolfo Millabur, Mapuche politician
- Dominga Neculmán, Mapuche potter
- Luz Vidal, Mapuche politician
- Laura Alarcón Rapu, Rapa Nui politician
- Marta Raquel Hotus Tuki, Rapa Nui politician
- Luz Zasso Paoa, Rapa Nui politician

=== Colombia ===
- Luis Díaz (born 1997), Wayúu football player
- Lucas Fernández de Piedrahita (1624–1688), Muisca Roman Catholic bishop
- Gaitana (16th century), Yalcón cacica
- Magdalena de Guatavita (16th century), Muisca noblewoman
- María Clemencia Herrera Nemerayema (born 1968), Witoto indigenous, women rights and biodiversity activist
- Belkis Florentina Izquierdo Torres, Arhuaco judge
- Carlos Jacanamijoy (born 1964), Inga Kichwa painter
- Hugo Jamioy Juagibioy (born 1971), Kamëntšá poet and indigenous rights activist
- Lilia Isolina Java Tapayuri (born 1984 or 1985), Kokama environmentalist and community leader
- Berito Kuwaru'wa, U'wa
- Quintín Lame (1880–1967), Paez political leader and author
- Bárbara Muelas (born 1945), Misak language activist, translator and academic
- Martha Peralta Epieyú, Wayúu lawyer and politician
- Aida Quilcué, Paez politician and human rights activist
- Álvaro Ulcué Chocué (1943–1984), Paez Roman Catholic priest and human rights activist
- Arelis Uriana (born 1976), Wayúu politician
- Efigenia Vásquez Astudillo (1986–2017), Kokonuko journalist
- Rosa Yolanda Villavicencio (born 1962), Mestizo politician

=== Ecuador ===
- Diana Aguavil (born 1983), Tsáchila leader
- Blanca Chancoso (born 1955), Otavalo leader and educator
- Camilo Egas (1889–1962), Mestizo, painter and educator
- Eugenio Espejo (1747–1795), Mestizo journalist, hygienist, lawyer, and satirical writer
- Amy Gende (born 1998), Tsáchila politician
- Cristina Gualinga (born 1939 or 1940), Quechua environmentalist and activist
- Helena Gualinga (born 2002), Quechua environmental and human rights
- Nina Gualinga (born 1993), Quechua environmental and indigenous rights activist
- Noemí Gualinga (born 1967 or 1968), Quechua leader in the Amazonian Ecuador
- Patricia Gualinga, Quechua women rights activist
- Oswaldo Guayasamín (1919–1999), Quechua painter and sculptor
- Leonidas Iza (c. 1982), Quechua-Panzaleo activist and indigenous leader
- Luis Macas (born 1951), Quechua politician and intellectual
- Eduardo Kingman (1913–1998), Mestizo painter
- Luis Macas (born 1951), Quechua anthropologist and politician
- Mincaye (c. 1935–2020), Hauo preacher and church elder
- Nina Pacari (born 1961), Quechua politician, lawyer and indigenous leader
- Delfín Quishpe (born 1977), Quechua singer and politician
- Antonio Vargas (1958–2025), Quechua politician

=== Peru ===
- Tupac Amaru (1545–1572), military figure and last Inca monarch
- Túpac Amaru II (1738–1781), leader of massive Andean uprising against Spanish colonial rule
- Teresita Antazú (born 1960), Yanesha leader
- Manco Cápac (c. 1200 – c. 1230), Sapa Inca of Cusco
- Rodrigo Callapina (16th century), Inca nobility claimer
- Martín Chambi (1891–1973), Quechua photographer
- Inca Garcilaso de la Vega (1539–1616), writer and chronicler
- Nadine Heredia (born 1976), Quechia politician and former First Lady of Peru
- Ollanta Humala (born 1962), Quechua politician and 58th President of Peru
- Matut Impi Ismiño (born 1979), Aguaruna leader
- Túpac Katari (c. 1750–1781), leader of an Andean uprising
- Q'orianka Kilcher (born 1994), Quechua-Harakmbut actress
- Angélica Mendoza de Ascarza (1929–2017), Quechua human rights activist
- Rocilda Nunta Guimaraes, Shipibo-Conibo politician
- Tania Pariona Tarqui (born 1984), Quechua politician and social worker
- Diego Quispe Tito (1611–1681), Quechua painter
- Tarcila Rivera Zea (born 1950), Quechua activist
- Tali Sabio Piuk (born 1984), Aguaruna indigenous leader
- Magaly Solier (born 1986), Quechua actress
- Yma Sumac (1922–2008), singer of self-identified Inca ancestry
- Alejandro Toledo, (born 1946), Quechua politician and 56th President of Peru
- Marcos Zapata (c. 1710–1773), Quechua Cuzco School painter
- Magaly Solier (born 1986), Quechua actress
- Luis Soto Colque (born 1973), Quechua biologist, sports journalist and communicator

=== Venezuela ===
- Daniela Larreal (1973–2024), cyclist with indigenous ancestry
- Aloha Núñez (born 1983), Wayúu politician
- Ramón Paz Ipuana (1937–1992), Wayúu linguist, poet and researcher
- Noelí Pocaterra (born 1936), Wayúu politician and indigenous activist
- Patricia Velásquez (born 1971), mestizo–Wayúu actress and model
- Clara Vidal (born 1983), Kalina politician

== See also ==
- List of Indigenous artists of the Americas
- List of writers from peoples Indigenous to the Americas
