= Colque (surname) =

Colque is a surname, a variant spelling of Qullqi, the Aymara and Quechua word for silver or money. Notable people with the name include:

- Juan Huanca Colque (b. 1966), a Bolivian politician
- Luis Soto Colque (b. 1973), a Peruvian biologist and sports journalist
- Percy Colque (b. 1976), a Bolivian former footballer
- Zacarías Colque (1967 – 2022), a Bolivian agricultural worker, politician, and trade unionist
