= Félix Berenguer de Marquina =

Mexican politician

The Most Excellent Félix Berenguer de Marquina KOS
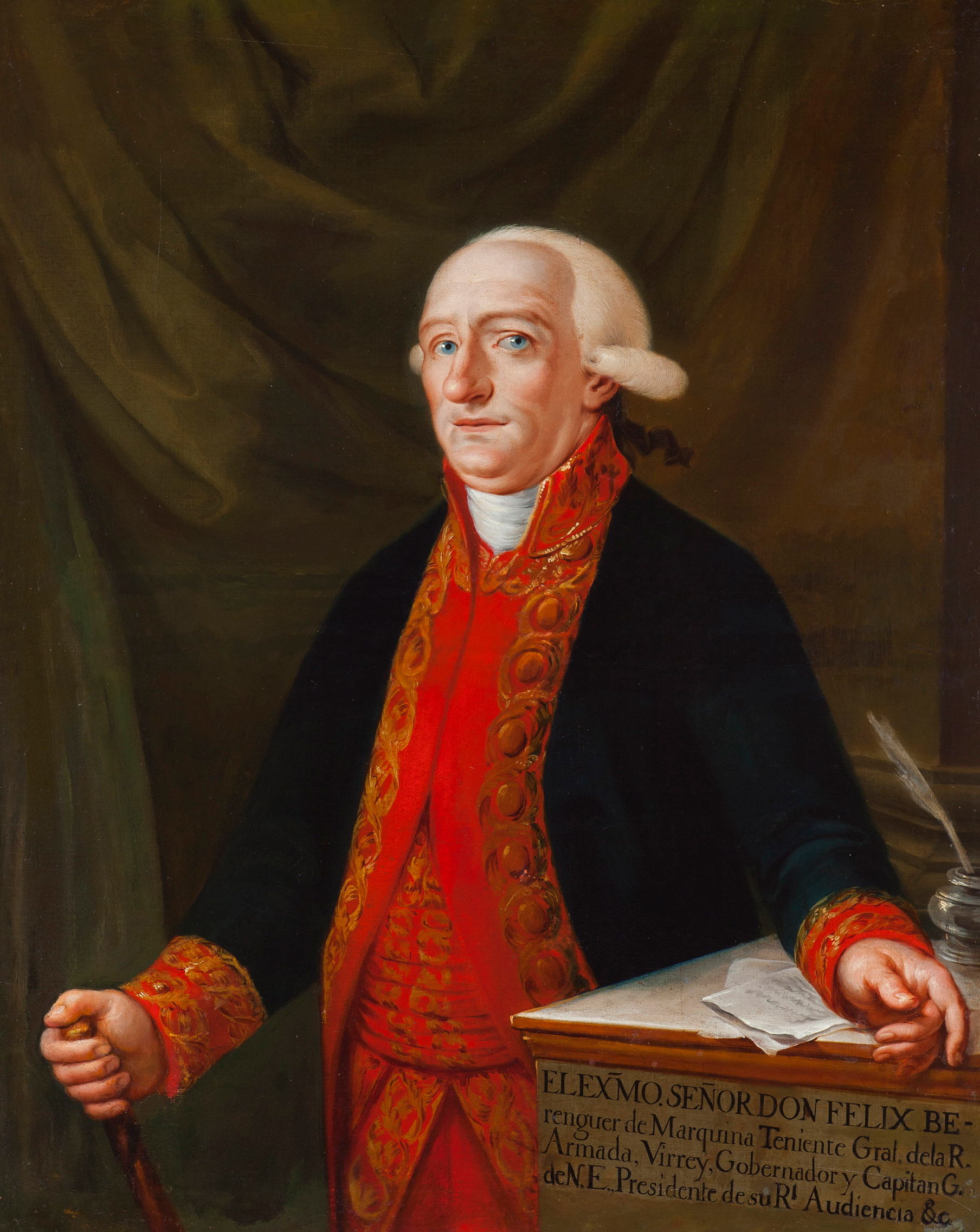

55th Viceroy of New Spain
- In office 30 April 1800 – 4 January 1803
- Monarch: Charles IV
- Preceded by: Miguel José de Azanza
- Succeeded by: José de Iturrigaray

55th Governor-General of the Philippines
- In office 1 July 1788 – 1 September 1793
- Monarch: Charles IV of Spain
- Governor: (Viceroy of New Spain); Manuel Antonio Flórez; Juan Vicente de Güemes, 2nd Count of Revillagigedo
- Preceded by: Pedro de Sarrio
- Succeeded by: Rafael María de Aguilar y Ponce de León

Personal details
- Born: Félix Ignacio Juan Nicolás Antonio José Joaquín Buenaventura Berenguer de Marquina y FitzGerald; November 20, 1733 Alicante, Spain
- Died: October 30, 1826 (aged 92) Alicante, Spain

Félix Ignacio Juan Nicolás Antonio José Joaquín Buenaventura Berenguer de Marquina y FitzGerald, KOS (November 20, 1733 – October 30, 1826) was a Spanish naval officer, colonial official and, from April 30, 1800 to January 4, 1803, viceroy of New Spain. His wife was María de Ansoátegui y Barrol from Spain.

== Origins and early career ==
=== Background ===
Berenguer de Marquina was born in Spain to a family of the minor nobility of Alicante in 1733. His father was Ignacio Vicente Berenguer de Marquina y Pasqual de Riquelme, descendant of one of the most influential families in Alicante. His mother, Mary FitzGerald, a native of Cork, could trace her ancestry back to the Anglo-Norman earls of Desmond.

Félix joined the navy at a very young age. On April 30, 1754 he took the midshipman examination. Thereafter he served on ships of war in the Mediterranean and the Atlantic.

=== Marriage ===
He married María de Ansoátegui y Barrol in 1758, thus becoming, years later, the uncle of one of Venezuela's Libertadores, José Antonio Anzoátegui.

=== Early career ===
He was studious, and became a teacher of mathematics and astronomy in the Naval Academy at Cartagena (1757–69). In 1789 he was named director of the organization of pilots of the fleet.

== Governor General of the Philippines ==
From July 1, 1788 to September 1, 1793 he was the Governor General of the Philippines. On August 15, 1789 by royal decree Manila became an open port to all but European products. He proposed plans for reform of the government. He became the namesake to one of the Philippines' largest cities, Marikina.

His 4th direct descendant, Ananías Diokno y Noblejas or the “General of the Seas,” was President Emilio Aguinaldo’s Naval General and was reputedly the only Philippine Revolutionary Army general to lead a full-scale military expedition to the Visayas against the Spanish forces. His successful landing in Bicol and Visayas were considered one of the first missions of the Philippine Navy. Berenguer de Marquina had an extramarital relationship with a native Tsinoy woman in Bicol named Demetria Sumulong with whom he sired a daughter named Isabel Berenguer de Marquina. It is from Isabel that the Sumulong and Diokno political clans of the provinces of Rizal and Batangas respectively descended. Other provinces with clans descending from Isabel include Cavite and Camarines Sur, Bicol. Berenguer de Marquina then left the country for Mexico upon his new appointment. A few notable descendants of Isabel, the daughter whom Berenguer de Marquina abandoned in the Philippines include, pro-Filipino nationalist senator and Supreme Court Justice- Sen. Ramón Diokno; the Father of Human Rights and son of Don Ramón- Sen. Jose W. Diokno; Judge Roberto Diokno; Filipino Lawyer, Tañada-Diokno School of Law Dean, congressman, and Human Rights Advocate - Cong. Chel Diokno; Filipino Historian at UP Diliman and former NHCP Chair - Maris Diokno; Prolific Writer, Author in Arts and History, and Culture Advocate - Santiago Diokno; Ben Diokno - Philippine Secretary of Finance; Juan Sumulong and son Lorenzo Sumulong - Filipino senators and lawyers; and Corazon Sumulong Cojuangco-Aquino and son Benigno Aquino III - Filipino presidents.

Berenguer returned to Spain in 1795 to take up a position in the administration of the navy. In 1799, he was promoted to lieutenant general of the navy.

== Viceroy of New Spain ==
He was in command of a squadron in the Spanish navy when, on November 8, 1799, King Charles IV named him viceroy and captain general of New Spain and president of the Audiencia. During the voyage from Cuba to Veracruz, he was taken prisoner by the British near Cape Catoche, Yucatán Peninsula (Quintana Roo). He was conducted to Jamaica. He was treated with much courtesy and later allowed to continue on his way in the schooner Kingston, with his secretary.

He accepted the transfer of authority into his offices April 29, 1800, in the Villa de Guadalupe, and made his formal entry into Mexico City the following day.

In this period. the British dominated both coasts of New Spain. They smuggled huge amounts of merchandise into the colony from the United States and the islands of the Caribbean and captured the Spanish ships in the coastal trade. Berenguer supplied more resources to Spanish naval forces, but they were unable to do much to improve the situation. He also formed the Regiment of Grenadiers, consisting of twelve companies drawn from six provincial forces. Fearing British raids, he reinforced the garrisons at Veracruz and ordered that the valuables of the port be moved to Jalapa and guarded. He also reinforced the presidios in the north, to repulse American encroachment.

On October 1, 1800, Spain retroceded the territory of Louisiana to France, which soon sold it to the United States.

== Conspiracies and Indian rebellions ==
On January 1, 1801, Indio Mariano began an insurrection in the mountains of Tepic. Mariano, who had many followers, was trying to reestablish the Aztec empire. The rebels fought under a banner displaying the colors of the Virgin of Guadalupe. When Fernando Abascal, president of the Audiencia of Guadalajara, took notice of the rebellion, he sent Captain Salvador Hidalgo (or Fidalgo) of the navy and Captain Leonardo Pintado of the militia against them. The rebels were defeated. Many prisoners were taken, and many other Indians were forced up into the mountains, but Mariano escaped. He was never captured by the Spanish. His followers who were taken prisoner were transferred to Guadalajara, but most were soon released.

Also, in January 1801, Francisco Antonio Vázquez, a naval official, was denounced for conspiracy, but nothing could be proven.

In Teocelo, Veracruz, Pedro Martín led another Indian rebellion. There were also attempted rebellions by the indigenous in Nayarit, Durango, Guanajuato, Jalisco and Sonora.

== Suppression of Philip Nolan ==
Berenguer suppressed the American smugglers under Philip Nolan in the north of the colony. Nolan was born about 1771, probably in Kentucky. He was a close associate of U.S. general and adventurer James Wilkinson, a co-conspirator of Aaron Burr. Beginning after 1791, Nolan began trading/smuggling activities in New Spain. He also imported wild horses from Texas into the United States. He was regarded by the Spaniards as a spy and a rebel. They sent troops to arrest him in 1801. He was killed in battle near the present city of Waco, Texas. His band was taken captive and sent to work the mines in northern New Spain. Nolan County, Texas is named for him. Edward Everett Hale used his name for the protagonist in his story "The Man Without a Country".

== Later administration in New Spain ==
Berenguer extended to the entire colony the requirement that no one be admitted into meetings of the guilds or confraternities without being decently dressed. He permitted women to work in jobs consistent with decency, even if the ordinances prohibited it.

In June 1801, Spain made peace with Portugal, and in 1802 with Britain. (The news of peace with Britain was published in Mexico on September 9, 1802). Thanks to the peace, prices of European goods dropped. In 1802, the payment of tribute to Spain was renewed.

== Legacy ==
Berenguer was persevering, honorable and valiant, but with little ability to govern.

His public works in Mexico City were very limited — one fountain that never gave water, and the completion of Manuel Tolsá's equestrian statue of Charles IV.

== Later years ==
Berenguer, disgusted with the disallowance of some of his measures, resigned. He turned over the government to his successor, José de Iturrigaray in January 1803. He returned to Spain, where he took part in the war with France. He died in 1826 in the city of his birth.
