= Tali Sabio Piuk =

Aguaruna Peruvian indigenous leader (born 1984)

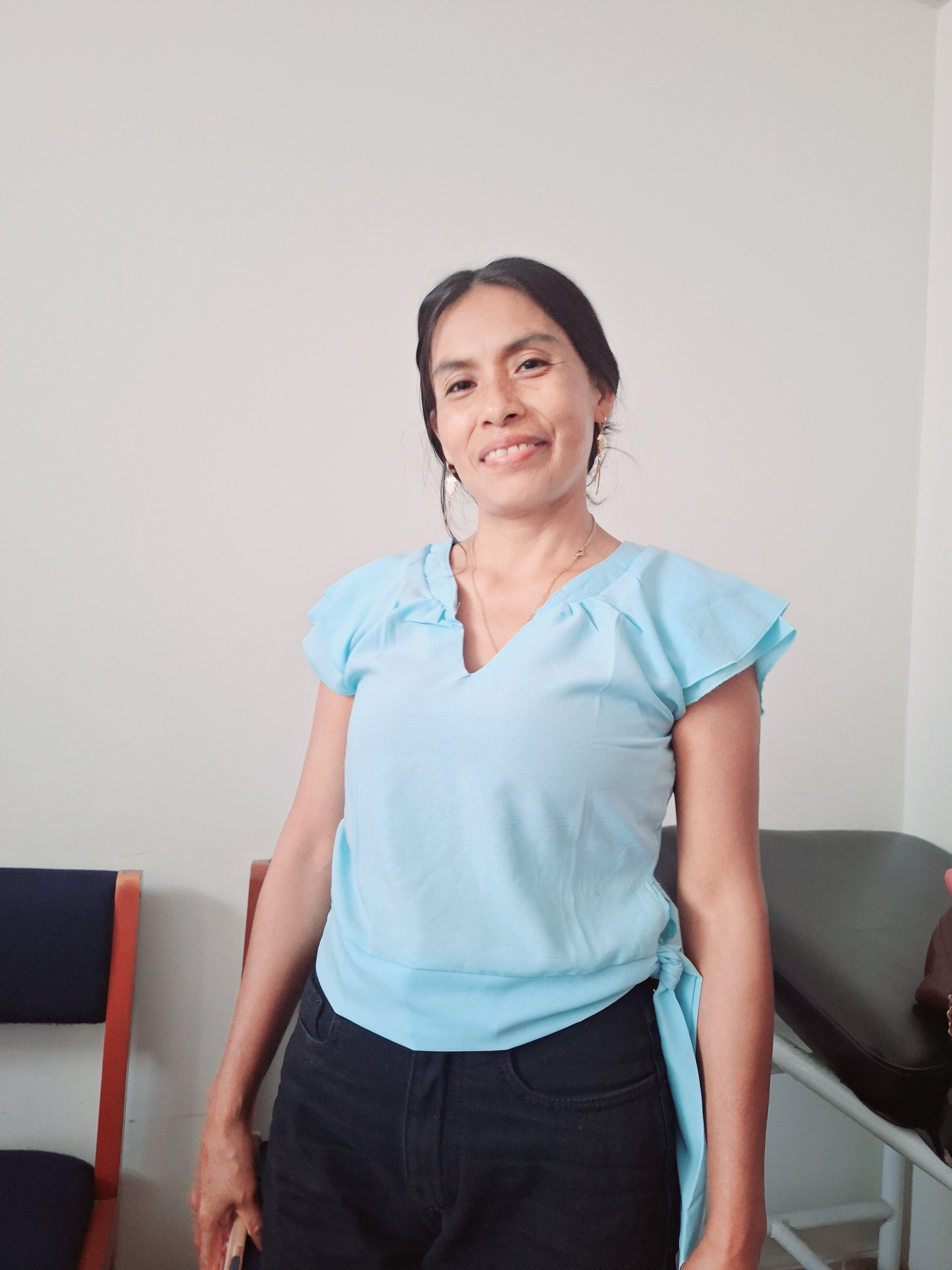
- Tali Sabio in 2025
- Born: August 24, 1984 (age 42); Amazonas, Peru

Talio Sabio Piuk (born 24 August 1984) is an Aguaruana Peruvian indigenous leader, first female leader (apu) of the Wawas indigenous community, in the Imaza District since 2022.

== Biography ==
Sabio Piuk was born on 24 August 1984 in the Aguaruna Wawas community in the Peruvian Amazonas. At the age of 18, she began participating in community meetings.

In January 2022, she was appointed unanimously as leader apu of the Wawas community, becoming the first women to ever be elected to this office. Prime Minister Mirtha Vásquez defined this appointment as historic and Sabio Piuk was also congratulated by Vice Minister of Interculturality Rocilda Nunta Guimaraes, the Ministry of Women and Vulnerable Populations and others politicians. In 2023 the Ministry of Culture awarded her the Distinguished Personality of Cuture, which President Dina Boluarte gave her in September that year.

She has three children.

== Honors ==
- Distinguished Personality of Culture (Government of Peru, 2023)
