= Clara Vidal =

Venezuelan politician

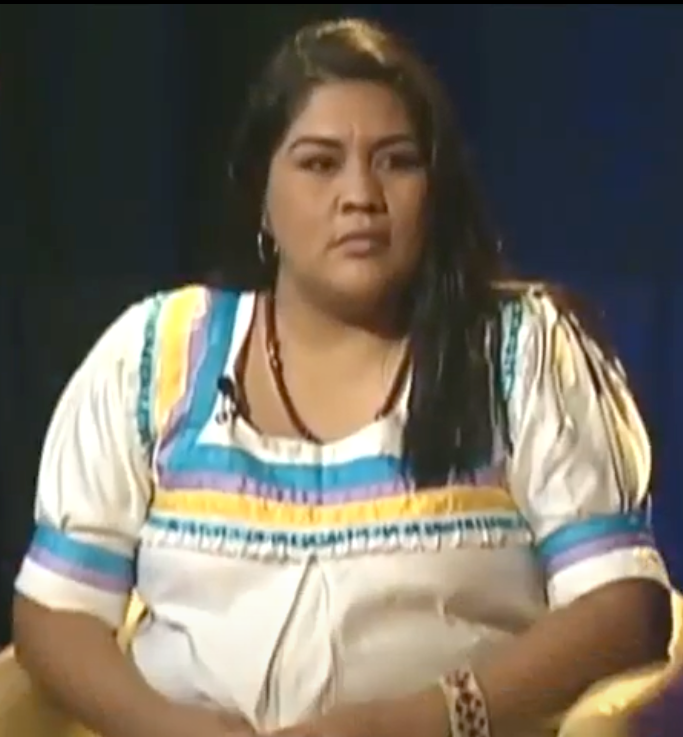
- In a 2023 interview

Minister of Indigenous Peoples of Venezuela
- Incumbent
- Assumed office 9 February 2022
- President: Nicolás Maduro
- Preceded by: Roside González

Personal details
- Born: 1 March 1983 (age 43)
- Party: United Socialist Party of Venezuela; United Socialist Party of Venezuela Youth; United Indigenous Movement of Venezuela

Clara Josefina Vidal Ventresca de Pérez (born 1 March 1983) is a Venezuelan politician of the Kariña people. She has been Minister of Indigenous Peoples in the National Assembly of Venezuela since 9 February 2022, having previously served in the role in 2016.

== Biography ==
Vidal is a member of the Kariña people.

Vidal is a member of the United Socialist Party of Venezuela Youth wing (JPSUV) and the politically allied organisation the United Indigenous Movement of Venezuela (MIUVEN). She has a degree in education and served as Deputy Minister for Training, Intercultural Education and Ancient Knowledge in 2014. She also served as Deputy Minister of the Communal Territory of the Delta, Mountains, Coasts, and Mangroves.

On 9 February 2022, Vidal was appointed Minister of Indigenous Peoples in the National Assembly of Venezuela by Nicolás Maduro, having previously served in the role in 2015-2016 after the Ministry of Aloha Núñez. As Minister, Vidal led the Venezuelan delegation to a United Nations (UN) Committee against Racial Discrimination and received her Brazilian counterpart, Sonia Guajajara, Minister of Indigenous Peoples of Brazil, before their participation at the 17th Ordinary General Assembly of the Fund for the Development of Indigenous Peoples of Latin America and the Caribbean (FILAC).

On International Women's Day in 2022, Vidal commented on the state-run television channel Venezolana de Televisión (VTV) that "being an Indigenous woman in these times means love, courage, and resilience. We can assume any responsibility we set for ourselves." Vidal also spoke at the event to commemorate "the 531st anniversary of the Day of Indigenous Resistance and Decolonization of the Americas" at the National Pantheon in Caracas in 2023, as the keynote speaker. She called to safeguard the territory of native peoples in Venezuela.

Vidal has also spoken out against demonstrations that took place during the 2024 Venezuelan presidential election. She was again ratified in her role as Minister of Indigenous Peoples in August 2024. In July 2025, Vidal was Electoral Commission of the United Socialist Party of Venezuela (PSUV).
