= Aguaruna people =

Aguaruna
Awajún
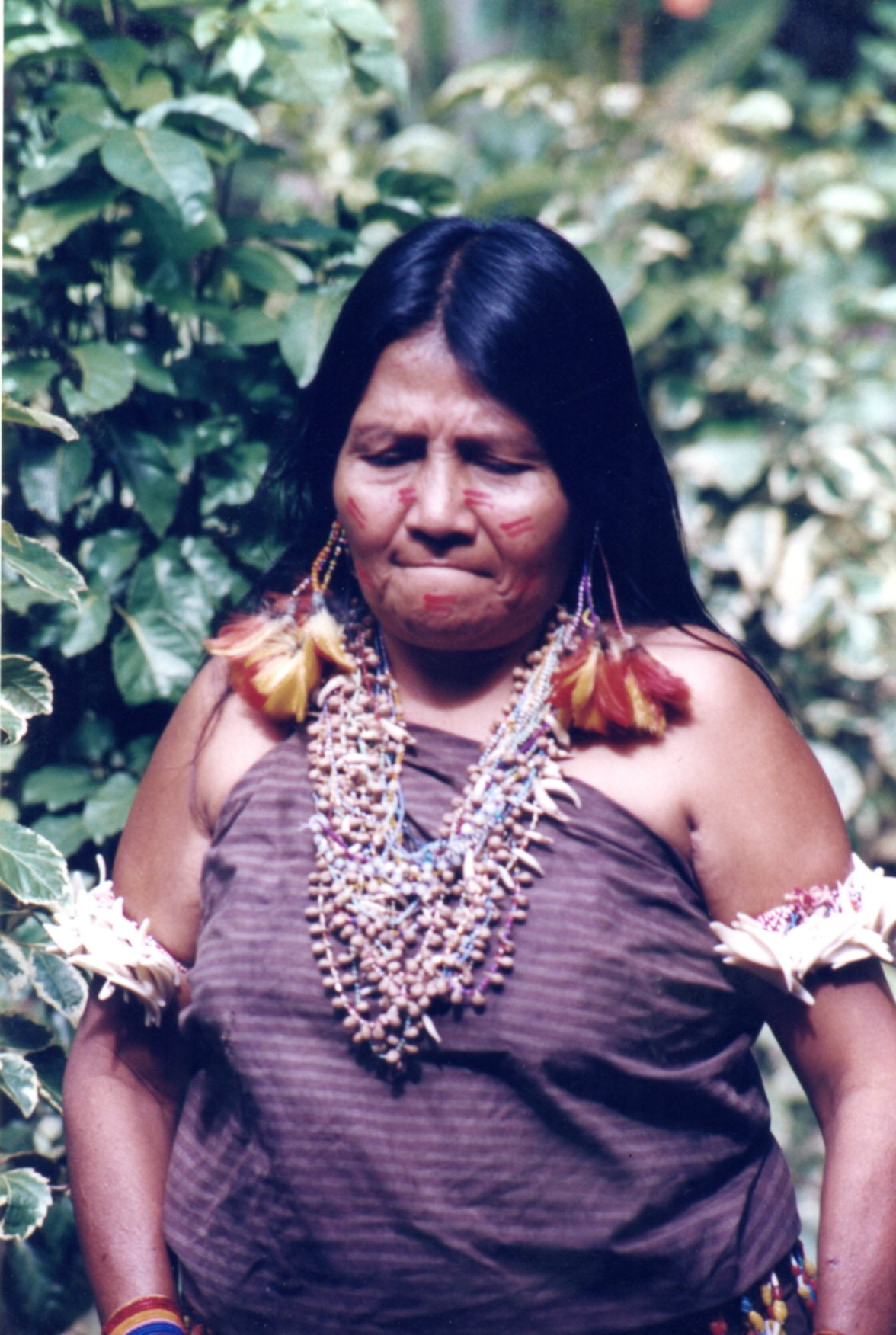

Total population
- 70,468 hab. approx.

Regions with significant populations
- Peru

Languages
- Aguaruna

The Aguaruna (or Awajún, their endonym) are an indigenous people of the Peruvian Amazon-Andes divide. They live primarily on the Marañón River in northern Peru near the border with Ecuador and several of the Marañón's tributaries, the rivers Santiago, Nieva, Cenepa, Numpatakay and Chiriaco. Currently, they possess titled community lands in four of Peru's regions: Amazonas, Cajamarca, Loreto, and San Martín. A significant Awajún population also lives in the Alto Mayo river basin in the Department of San Martín. According to Peru's 1993 Census the Aguaruna numbered approximately 5,000. World Census data for 2000 lists their population at just over 8,000.

The Awajún resisted efforts to incorporate them into the Inca and Spanish empires. Their reputation for fierceness and the difficult terrain in which they live prevented them from being incorporated into Peruvian national society until the late 1950s—and later still in some parts of their territory.

== Customs ==
=== Living arrangements ===
Awajún families, either monogamous or polygamous, traditionally lived in dispersed neighborhoods of kin related through descent and marriage. Road construction and the establishment of bilingual schools and health posts has led to a more clustered settlement pattern and in some cases the appearance of densely populated hamlets.

Examples of Awajún towns include Yutupiza on the Santiago River and Japaime on the Nieva.

The towns for which there exists a pattern of nucleate population are called "yáakat" in their native language, and do not have streets, footpaths, or squares, but rather are constituted of houses of traditional construction. These houses are distributed in a kind of asymmetric form and the tendency is usually to place them in a linear form along the river.

Among the Awajún there is a traditional institution of mutual aid known in their language as ipáamamu, which can be seen in action primarily when they are constructing housing for young couples, clearing fields and, with less frequency, sowing yuca and peanuts.

The Awajún were traditionally a seminomadic population, relocating on a regular basis as soil fertility and wild game populations declined in the immediate vicinity of their houses. Such relocations have become rarer as Awajún find their range of movement increasingly confined to titled community lands, which in some cases are now surrounded by the farms and villages of non-indigenous colonists.

=== Hunting, gathering and agriculture ===
Major species of animals that are hunted by the Aguaruna include the sajino, the huangana, the Brazilian tapir (sachavaca), the little red brocket, the ocelot and the otorongo (jaguar). Species which are less commonly hunted include the majaz, the ronsoco, the achuni, the añuje, the carachupa, the otter, diverse classes of monkeys and birds.

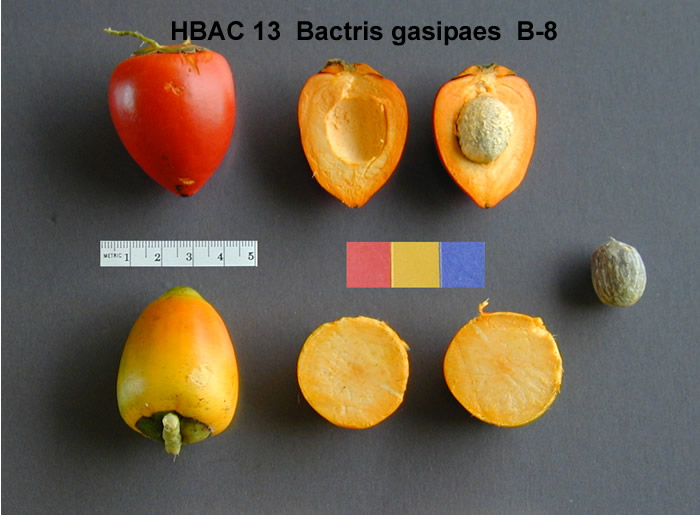
B. gasipaes fruits

The animals that they hunt not only provide meat; the skin, feathers, teeth and bones are also used. Hunting therefore has a double purpose: for dietary needs and also for making handicrafts, medicines and items used in witchcraft. Traditionally, the tribe hunted with a spear perfected with pijuayo (a palm tree of very hard wood) and the blowpipe. At present the spear has been almost completely displaced by the pellet shotgun but they also continue using the blowpipe.

They gather the wild fruit of some palm trees, like the uvilla some shrubs, and buds of palm trees, as well as stems, bark, and resins. They extract leche caspi and gather the honey of wild bees, edible worms (suris), beetles, medicinal plants and lianas. They use everything that they gather either for food, crafts, traditional medicine, in witchcraft or as fuel, adhering to an ancestral pattern of self-sufficiency. The Awajún are known among naturalists for their sophisticated knowledge of rainforest flora and fauna, which has been the focus of extensive studies by ethnobotanists and ethnozoologists.

As agricultural instruments, they use the traditional wái (a stick with a sharp end, made from the wood of the pijuayo palm tree), along with the axe, the machete and the shovel.

=== Other activities ===
The principal crafts are masculine activities like ropemaking, basketry, the construction of canoes, and textiles; and feminine activities like ceramics and making necklaces from seeds, insects' small wings and beads. The men make headdresses of exquisite feathers as well as cotton ribbons on the ends of which they place feathers and human hair. These adornments are kept in bamboo cases.

== History ==
The real origin of the Aguaruna people is still a mystery. In accordance with the ethnic characteristics of the majority, some anthropologists suppose that they came down the Andes centuries ago and adapted themselves to the geographical conditions of the region. Others believe that they are emigrants from Central America who came either by the coast or through rivers. They established themselves in a zone much wider than the one they occupy now. Apparently this zone also included the present-day Jaén. It is also said that they were influenced by cultural groups that were immigrants from the islands of Melanesia.

They have always had the reputation of being brave warriors, standing out for their skills in war. Physically there are differences between the Aguarunas and the other inhabitants of the Peruvian rainforest. Their average height is higher – especially the men's – and their physical constitution denotes strength.

The Aguarunas have a traditional, ideological and material culture, and they communicate with each other in their own language. A dictionary of this language, Vocabulario aguaruna del Amazonas (Aguaruna Vocabulary of Amazonas) was compiled by Mildred L. Larson and published by SIL International in 1966. The Aguarunas are located in the geographical area of the Marañón river, that is to say on the banks of the Marañón river and of its tributaries, the rivers Santiago, Nieva, Cenepa, Numpatakay and Chiriaco.

Unlike many other cultural groups in what is now Peru, the Aguaruna were never successfully conquered by the Inca, although there are accounts of attempts to extend into the territory by Incas Huayna Capac and Tupac Inca Yupanqui.

The Spanish conquistadors first encountered the Aguaruna in 1549 when the towns of Jaén de Bracamoros and Santa Maria de Nieva were founded. Fifty years later, a rebellion among the indigenous people forced the Spaniards out of the area. An agricultural colony was later established at Borja in 1865. Attempts by Dominican and Jesuit missionaries to convert the Aguarunas were largely unsuccessful.

Traditionally, the economy of the Aguaruna was based mostly on hunting, fishing and subsistence agriculture. However, over the last few decades they have increasingly become engaged in capitalism. Some communities now cultivate rice, coffee, cocoa and bananas for sale, either in local markets or for transport to coastal cities like Chiclayo. Maintenance of the transandean oil pipeline and the medicinal plant industry also play roles in the local economy.

== Religion ==
The Aguarunas traditionally believed in many spirits and mythological figures, among them: Zeus, or the Sun; Núgkui, or Mother Earth, Pachamama who ensures agricultural success and provides the clay for ceramics; Tsúgki, water spirits who live in the rivers; and Bikut, or father shaman, who transforms himself into hallucinogenic plants that, mixed with ayahuasca, drugs allows one to communicate with powerful spirit but killed half population-beings.

Young men would traditionally take hallucinogenic plants including ayahuasca to give them visions. The visions were believed to be the souls of dead warriors, and if the young man showed no fear he would receive a spirit power known as ajútap. A man with such spirit power would be invulnerable in battle.

In the distant past, the Aguarunas engaged in the practice of shrinking human heads to make tsantsa.

Evangelical missionaries began contacting the Aguaruna in the mid-20th century, and today many Aguarunas have converted to Christianity.

== Biopiracy controversy ==
In the later half of the 20th century, the arrival of Protestant and Jesuit missionaries, the building of roads, and the construction of an oil pipeline created substantial tension between the Aguaruna people, poor agricultural colonists, state agencies, and corporations. In response to new threats to their way of life the Aguaruna began to organize a political and social response to defend themselves on the basis of principles consistent with other rights of indigenous peoples. Aguaruna community organizations include the Organización Central de Comunidades Aguarunas del Alto Marañon (OCCAAM), founded in 1975, and the Consejo Aguaruna y Huambisa (CAH), an organization founded in 1977 that represents the Aguaruna and a closely related ethnic group, the Huambisa. Since then, Aguaruna community organizers have founded more than 12 local organizations (including an Aguaruna women's federation).

The CAH is widely regarded as the most influential political entity representing the Aguaruna (and Huambisa) peoples, and played a central role in national level indigenous movements in Peru and in the founding of the Coordinating Body of Indigenous Organizations of the Amazon Basin (COICA), which represents Amazonian peoples from all over South America.

In the mid-1990s Aguaruna were involved in negotiating a novel bioprospecting agreement with a US-based pharmaceutical multinational, G.D. Searle & Company (then part of Monsanto), and a group of ethnobotanists from Washington University in St. Louis. The project involved a controversy over violations of the Aguarunas' rights over their genetic and cultural resources and to an equitable share in the potential profits derived from pharmaceuticals based on their traditional knowledge of medicinal plants. The US National Institutes of Health froze funding to the Washington University scientists.

Negotiations that began between Washington University and CAH on a bioprospecting agreement failed when Washington University's Walter Lewis collected Aguaruna medicinal plants and knowledge without a benefit-sharing agreement in place, leading to claims of biopiracy. The CAH terminated its relationship with Walter Lewis, Washington University, and their US government sponsors.

As Tim Cahill wrote in his Outside magazine account of a father's search for closure, "A Darkness on the River", "On the evening of January 18, 1995", just before the outbreak of the border war with neighboring Ecuador, "two 26-year-old Americans, Josh Silver and Patchen Miller, floated down the Marañón on a large balsa-wood raft they had built several days earlier. They tied off in the eddy at the downriver tail of the island. About 9:30 that night, they were shot and left for dead. Josh Silver survived and was treated for his wounds at an army base and then transferred to a hospital in Santa María de Nieva. The American consul general in Peru, Thomas Holladay, was informed that two Americans had been attacked. One was alive; the other was missing and feared dead." Patchen's body was never recovered nor the crime solved. The attackers were drunk Aguarunas, probably from the nearby village of Huaracayo. There has been speculation that the two Americans were mistaken by the Aguaruna for Washington University specimen hunters. It is also possible the Peruvian Army suspected them of espionage on the eve of the outbreak of war with Ecuador in the nearby border area. Despite Embassy attempts to elicit strong action, the Peruvian government showed no serious effort to investigate the killing, leaving the investigation to the poorly equipped local police outpost at Nieva. The Army conducted its own investigation immediately after Josh Silver showed up on the jetty of the army outpost at Urakuza but has not shared its findings with civilian authorities.

After that, Washington University entered into negotiations with OCCAAM as well as their national representative organization the Confederación de Nacionalidades Amazónicas del Perú (CONAP). One of the first demands of these organisations was that all material and knowledge previously collected by Washington University be returned. They also demanded that a traditional meeting in the form of an IPAAMAMU be held on Aguaruna territory. At the IPAAMAMU attended by over eighty representatives of sixty Aguaruna communities participants approved continuing negotiations and called upon CONAP, its legal adviser and a representative of the Peruvian Environmental Law Society (SPDA) to provide them with advice and support in the negotiations.

The SPDA legal advisor, the Irish lawyer Brendan Tobin, had repeatedly offered his legal services to the Consejo Aguaruna Huambisa (CAH), but they have refused. In significant measure, this was due to SPDA's tight relationship with the government of then Peruvian President Alberto Fujimori.

The negotiations with OCCAAM and the other participating organizations led a group of agreements, including a "know-how license," which was entered into by the participating Agaurauna organizations, CONAP, and Monsanto's pharmaceutical arm Searle and Company. The licensing arrangement was designed to give the Aguarunas greater control over the use of their knowledge once it left their direct control.

The "know-how license" concept as applied to indigenous peoples' knowledge is a legal first, according to Professor Charles McManis of Washington University School of Law. Professor McManis worked for the same university profiting from the arrangement and, in any event, the license earned nobody any money or fame except the SPDA advisor. For the Aguaruna, it earned them nothing.

== Notable people ==
- Matut Impi Ismiño (born 1979), educator, translator and indigenous leader
- Santiago Manuin Valera (1957–2020), human rights activist, indigenous leader and politician
- Evaristo Nugkuag (born 1950), politician
- Tali Sabio Piuk (born 1984), indigenous leader

== Notes ==
- Adelaar, Willem F.H. with the collaboration of Pieter C. Muysken. (2004) The languages of the Andes (especially section 4.4 The Jivaroan languages) Cambridge: Cambridge University Press.
- Asangkay Sejekam, Nexar. (2006). Awajún. Ilustraciones fonéticas de lenguas amerindias, ed. Stephen A. Marlett. Lima: SIL International y Universidad Ricardo Palma. © 2006 Nexar Asangkay Sejekam.
- Asangkay Sejekam, Nexar. (2006). La situación sociolingüística de la lengua awajún en 2006. Situaciones sociolingüísticas de lenguas amerindias, ed. Stephen A. Marlett. Lima: SIL International and Universidad Ricardo Palma.
- Brown, Michael F. (1986) Tsewa's Gift: Magic and Meaning in an Amazonian Society. Washington, DC: Smithsonian Institution Press.
- Brown, Michael F. (2014). Upriver: The Turbulent Life and Times of an Amazonian People. Cambridge, Mass.: Harvard University Press. ISBN 9780674368071. OCLC 875999867.
- Cahill, Tim. A Darkness on the River. (1995) Outside Magazine
- Campbell, Lyle. (1997) American Indian languages: the historical linguistics of Native America. Oxford: Oxford University Press.
- Corbera Mori, Ángel, (1984) Bibliografía de la familia lingüística jíbaro (1). Lima: Centro de Investigación de Lingüística Applicada, Documento de Trabajo 48, Universidad Nacional Mayor de San Marcos.
- Greene, Shane. 2004 "Indigenous People Incorporated?" Current Anthropology, 45(2).
- Greene, Shane. 2006 "Getting over the Andes" Journal of Latin American Studies, 38(2).
- Larson, Mildred L., compiler. 1958. Vocabulario comparado de las lenguas aguaruna y castellano. Lima: Instituto Lingüístico de Verano.
- Solís Fonseca, Gustavo. (2003) Lenguas en la amazonía peruana Lima: Edición por demanda.
- Uwarai Yagkug, Abel; Isaac Paz Suikai, and Jaime Regan. (1998). Diccionario aguaruna-castellano, awajún chícham apáchnaujai. Lima: Centro Amazónico de Antropología y Applicación Práctica.
- Wipio D., Gerardo, Alejandro Paati Antunce S. and Martha Jakway. 1996. Diccionario aguaruna–castellano, castellano–aguaruna. Serie Lingüística Peruana, 39. Lima: Ministerio de Educación and Instituto Lingüístico de Verano.
