= Qullqi =

Qullqi (Aymara and Quechua for silver or money, also spelled Ccolcce, Ccolque, Collque, Colqui, Colque, Jollje) may refer to:

- Qullqi (Cusco), a mountain in the Cusco Region, Peru
- Qullqi (Lima), a mountain in the Lima Region, Peru
- Qullqi (Puno), a mountain in the Puno Region, Peru

== See also ==
- Colque (surname)
