= Mari Luz Canaquiri Murayari =

Peruvian and Kukama environmental activist

- Born: 1974 (age 51–52); Shapajilla, Peru
- Occupations: Indigenous activist; Environmental activist
- Organization: President of Huaynakana Kamatahuara Kana
- Awards: Goldman Environmental Prize 2025, Time 100 2026

Mari Luz Canaquiri Murayari (born 1974) is a Peruvian Kukama environmental and indigenous activist who has been the founder and president of the Kukama women's association Huaynakana Kamatahuara Kana since 2001. She rose to global prominence for leading Huaynakana Kamatahuara Kana in suing the government in an effort to grant the Marañón River legal personhood, which succeeded in 2024. She won the Goldman Environmental Prize in 2025 and became one of the Time 100 in 2026.

== Biography ==
She was born and raised in the Kukama village of Shapajilla, on the Marañón River in Peru, a river that is sacred to the Kukama people and that the Kukama people depend on for transportation and to fish for food and for revenue. She delivered her youngest daughter on a boat in the Marañón. She is deeply Christian.

After spending some time working in Iquitos, she returned to her village to become a community advocate.

After a disastrous oil spill in 2000, she went to Iquitos to protest together with a group of other Kukama women. This sparked an idea to form an organization, and in 2001 she became the founder and president of Huaynakana Kamatahuara Kana (HKK), a Kukama women's group.

In 2010, there was another, even larger oil spill, and she led advocacy efforts to get accountability for the spill, positioning her group as the core group for environmental issues affecting the community. In 2014, the government of Peru sought to dredge the Marañón River without properly consulting the local communities, so Canaquiri coordinated with an NGO to sue the government and successfully stop the dredging.

In 2021, HKK began suing the government of Peru to grant the Marañón River legal personhood. In 2024, a court in the Department of Loreto ruled in favor of her, finding that the river had sufficient legal personhood to have the right to be free-flowing and free of contamination, and established the Indigenous peoples of the area as the guardian of the river. Another court, later that year, upheld that ruling. HKK has since focused on ensuring the ruling is implemented.

In 2023, she was awarded the Terres de Femme International Women's Award. In 2025, she was awarded the Goldman Environmental Prize for her success in getting the river legal personhood. In 2026, she was made one of the Time 100 for the year: her article was written by Time senior editor Kyla Mandell.
