= Tarcila Rivera Zea =

Quechua activist

Member of the United Nations Permanent Forum on Indigenous Issues
- Incumbent
- Assumed office 5 April 2016

Personal details
- Born: 24 December 1950 (age 75) San Francisco de Pujas, Ayacucho, Peru
- Awards: Order of Merit for Women (2010), Visionary Award (2011)

Tarcila Rivera Zea (Quechua: Tarsila Riwira Siya; born 24 December 1950) is a Quechua activist, member of the United Nations Permanent Forum on Indigenous Issues since her election on 5 April 2016 and awarded with the Visionary Award granted by the Ford Foundation in 2011 for her fight of Indigenous rights.

== Early life ==
Tarcila Rivera Zea was born in the community of San Francisco de Pujas, Ayacucho, capital of the province of Huamanga, Peru. As a child she had to work as a household employee in order to receive education, learning Spanish at the age of 8. Upon her arrival in the capital at only ten years, she was the victim of discrimination because of her status as an Andean woman.

== Career ==
During the 1970s, she worked as a specialized secretary in archival and library science at the Ministry of Culture of Peru, studying at the Vatican City and Argentina. Years later she would collaborate as a journalist for the Pueblo Indio magazine of the Indian Council of South America (CISA).

In recognition of her work in collecting testimonies of indigenous women raped during armed conflicts, she was invited to pursue specialization courses in human rights at the Institute for Social Studies (ISS) in The Hague, The Netherlands, and the International Center for Education in Human Rights in Charlottetown, Canada.

In 1987 she began to participate in international processes on the rights of indigenous peoples, as well as in United Nations conferences on Women, which led her to be invited by UN Women in 2012 to be part of her International Advisory Group on the Civil Society.

Rivera Zea is the founder of the Continental Link of Indigenous Women of the Americas (ECMIA) and the International Forum of Indigenous Women (FIMI), two networks that promote the empowerment and political involvement of the world's indigenous women.

In addition, her activism focused on recognition and visibility of the cultures and indigenous peoples of Peru. She was involved in the creation of the Permanent Workshop of Andean and Amazonian Indigenous Women of Peru and of the Center of Indigenous Cultures of Peru (CHIRAPAQ).

She has been president of the Indigenous organization 'Chirapaq' and is currently its vice-president, coordinator of the Continental Liaison for Indigenous Women of the Americas (ECMIA), member of the Board of Directors of the Voluntary Fund for Indigenous Peoples of the United Nations between 2006 and 2011. She has also collaborated in the creation of the International Indigenous Press Agency (AIPIN).

== Awards ==
The work done by Tarcila Rivera Zea as an activist for the rights of the indigenous population and their culture has been recognized internationally, which is reflected in the awards and distinctions she has received, such as:

- The Order of Merit for Women, which received 2010 in recognition of its commitment to the defense of the rights of the indigenous peoples of Peru.
- The Visionary Award of the Ford Foundation, in 2011 for the work done with Chirapaq.
