= Evaristo Nugkuag =

Peruvian activist (born 1950)

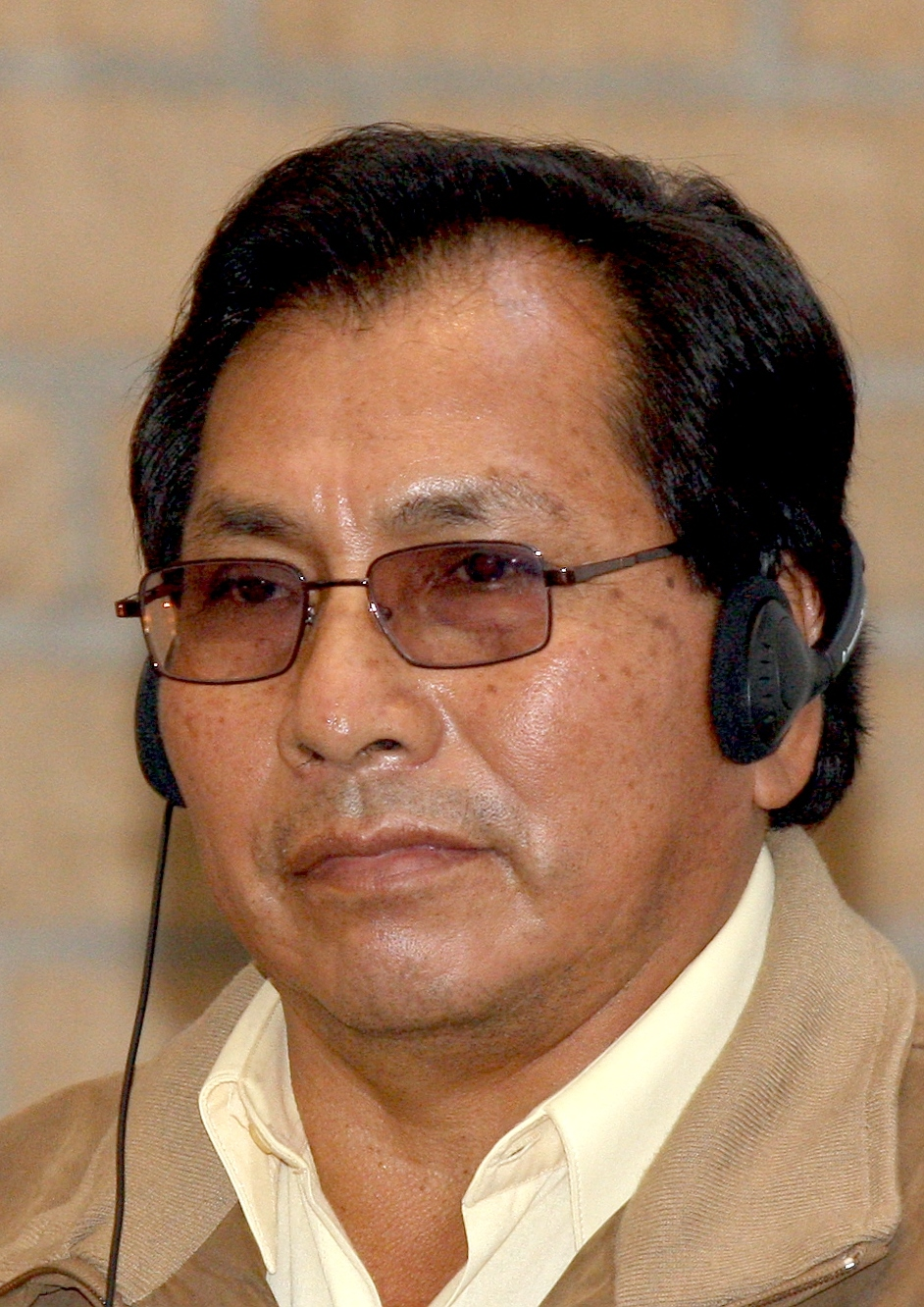
Nugkuag in 2010

Evaristo Nugkuag Ikanan (born 1950) is a Peruvian activist for environmental and indigenous people causes. He is a member of the Aguaruna people. He organized the Alliance of the Indian Peoples of the Peruvian Amazon (AIDESEP) and Coordinadora de las Organizaciones Indígenas de la Cuenca Amazónica "COICA" to serve indigenous people. In 1986, he was awarded the Right Livelihood Award for "organising to protect the rights of the Indians of the Amazon basin."

== Awards ==
- 1986 Right Livelihood Award
- 1991 Goldman Environmental Prize
