= Padre Las Casas, Chile =

Padre Las Casas
- City and Commune
- Coat of arms Location of the commune of Padre Las Casas in the Araucanía Region Location in Chile
- Coordinates: 38°46′S 72°36′W
- Country: Chile
- Region: Araucanía
- Province: Cautín
- Established: 2 June 1995
- Named for: Bartolomé de las Casas

Government
  - Type: Municipality
  - Alcalde: Mario González Rebolledo

Area
  - Total: 400.7 km^{2} (154.7 sq mi)
- Elevation: 86 m (282 ft)

Population (2012 Census)
  - Total: 72,892
  - Density: 181.9/km^{2} (471.1/sq mi)
  - Urban: 33,697
  - Rural: 25,098
- Demonym: Padrelascasino

Sex
  - Men: 29,327
  - Women: 29,468
- Time zone: UTC−4 (CLT)
  - Summer (DST): UTC−3 (CLST)
- Area code: 56 + 45
- Website: Official website (in Spanish)

Padre Las Casas (Spanish pronunciation: [ˈpaðɾe las ˈkasas]) is a Chilean city and commune located in Cautín Province, Araucanía Region. Padre Las Casas spans a landlocked area of 400.7 km^{2} (155 sq mi). Formerly part of the commune of Temuco, Padre Las Casas became a separate commune in 1995.

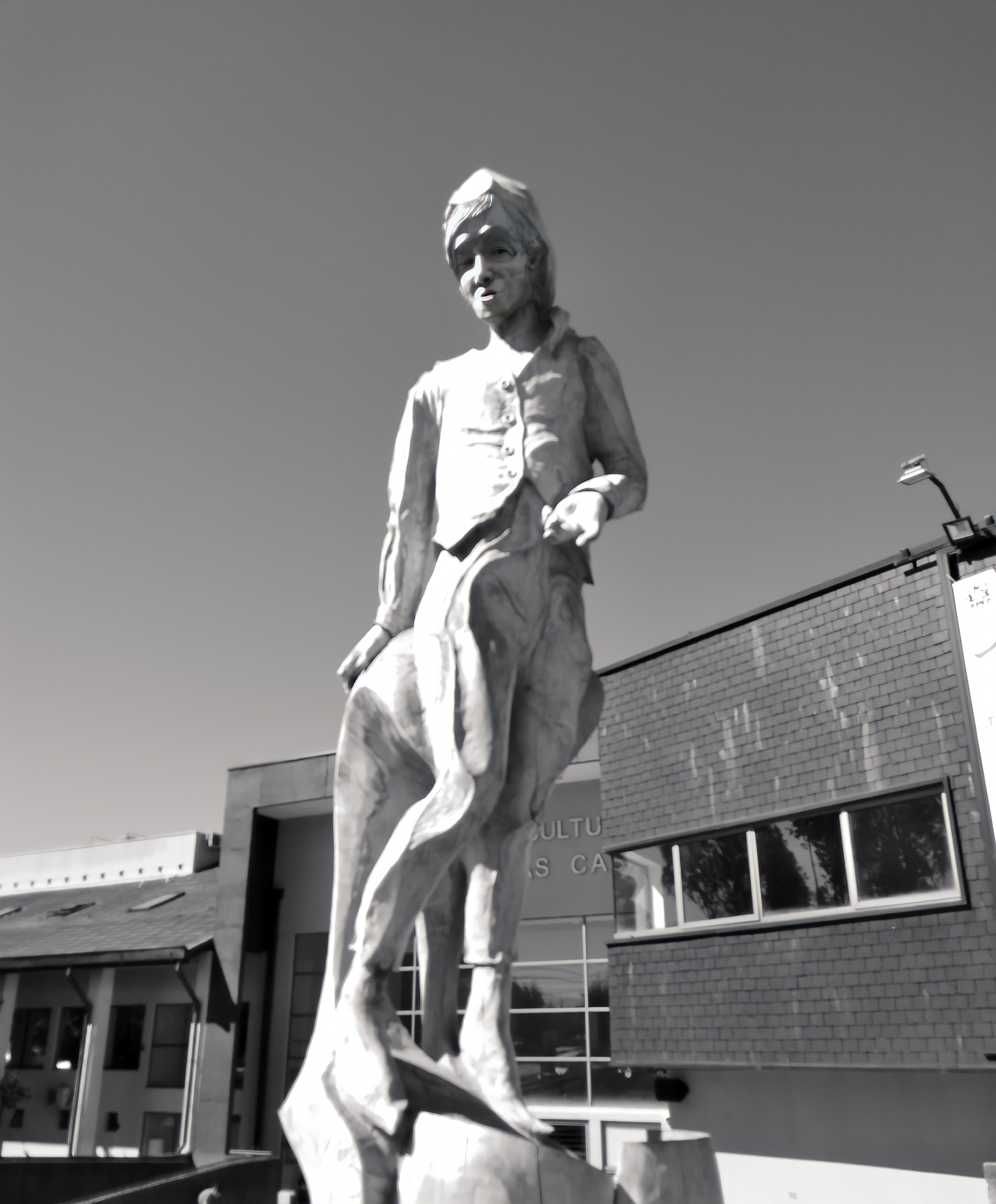
The Wink of Theater, sculpture by Jorge Fuentealba, located at Padre Las Casas cultural center's entrance.

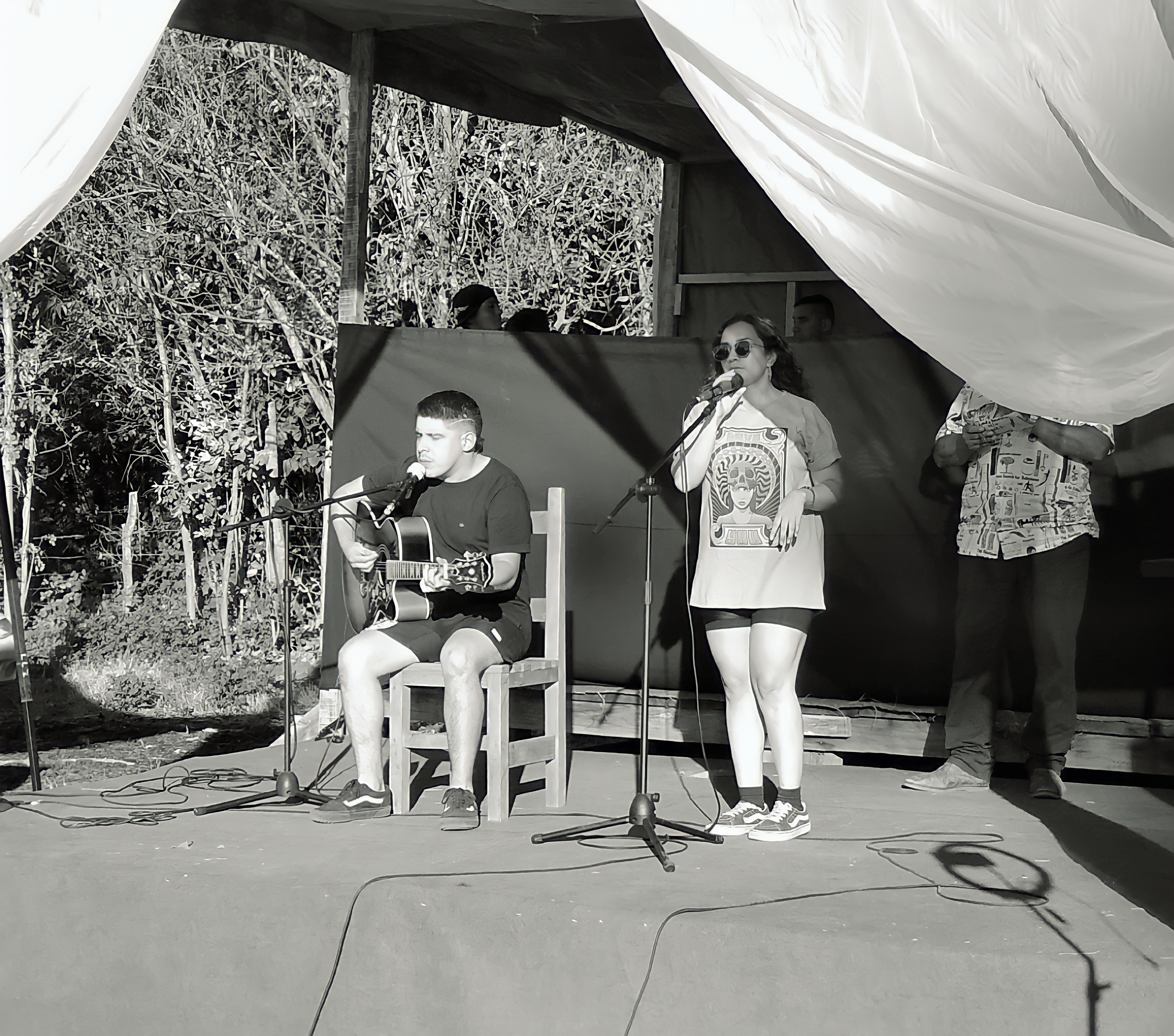
Astreke y Fer G duo in Padre Las Casas.

== Demographics ==
Historical population
Year	Pop.	±% p.a.
2002	60,073	—
2017	76,126	+1.59%
2024	80,656	+0.83%
Source: "Censo de Población y Vivienda". National Statistics Institute.

According to the 2002 census of the National Statistics Institute, Padre Las Casas spans an area of 400.7 km^{2} (155 sq mi) and has 58,795 inhabitants (29,327 men and 29,468 women). Of these, 33,697 (57.3%) lived in urban areas and 25,098 (42.7%) in rural areas. Between the 1992 and 2002 censuses, the population grew by 26.9% (12,470 persons).

== Notable people ==
- Francisca Linconao (born 1958), Mapuche spiritual leader and politician
- Dominga Neculmán (1937–2022), Mapuche potter
- Luz Vidal (born 1973), Mapuche politician
