= University of Zulia =

University in Venezuela

La Universad del Zulia
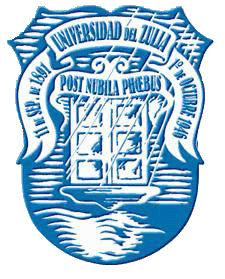
- Motto: Post Nubila Phoebus (After the clouds, the sun)
- Type: Public
- Established: May 29, 1891 (re-opened October 1, 1946)
- Students: 28,000
- Location: Maracaibo, Zulia, Venezuela
- Website: www.luz.edu.ve

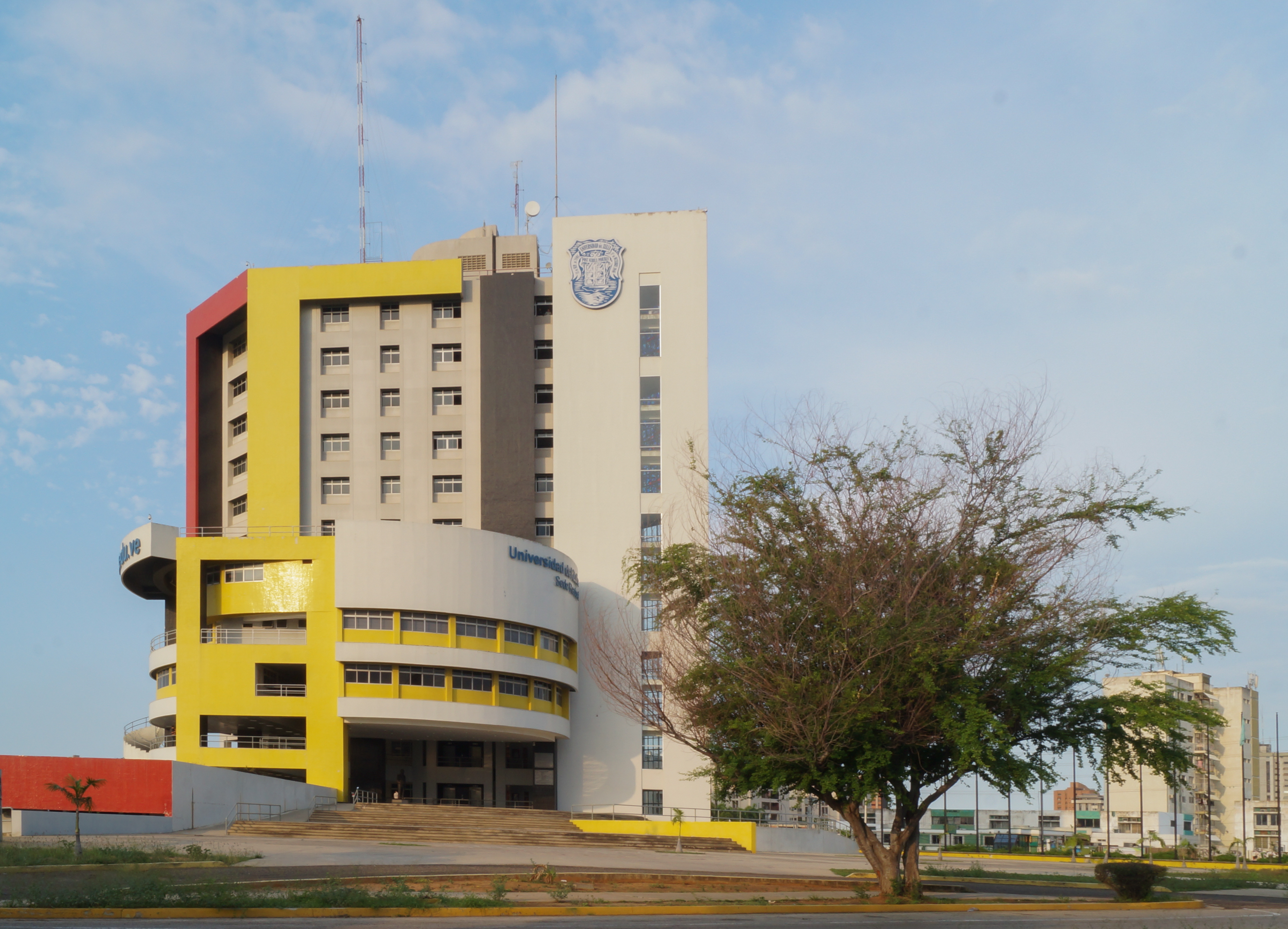
University of Zulia

The University of Zulia (Spanish: La Universidad del Zulia, abbreviated as LUZ) is a public university, based in the city of Maracaibo, Venezuela.

The University of Zulia has three campuses: two in Zulia State, in the cities of Maracaibo (the biggest and most important one) and Cabimas; and one in the city of Punto Fijo, located in Falcón State.

== History ==
The history of the university begins when a decree converting the Federal College of Maracaibo into the University of Zulia was passed on May 29, 1891. The university itself began its operations on September 11 of that same year. Its first Chancellor was Francisco Ochoa.

In 1909, the government ordered the closure of the university for political reasons. It would remain closed until October 1, 1946. This event is known as La Reapertura (The Reopening). The first Chancellor after the reopening was Jesús Enrique Lossada.

== Academics ==
The university offers the following undergraduate programs:

- School of Agronomy
  - Agronomy
- School of Architecture and Design
  - Architecture
  - Graphic Design
- School of Arts
  - Fine Arts
  - Dance
  - Theatre
  - Visual Arts
  - Music
  - Museology
- School of Dentistry
  - Dentistry
- School of Economical & Social Sciences
  - Business Administration
  - Accounting
  - Sociology
  - Economics
- School of Engineering
  - Civil Engineering
  - Electrical Engineering
  - Geodesic Engineering
  - Industrial Engineering
  - Petroleum Engineering
  - Chemical Engineering
  - Mechanical Engineering
- School of Humanities & Education
  - Literature
  - Philosophy
  - Information Science
  - Journalism
  - Education
- School of Law & Political Sciences
  - Law
  - Social Work
  - Political Science
- School of Medicine
  - Bioanalysis
  - Nursing
  - Medicine
  - Nutrition
- School of Sciences
  - Biology
  - Computer Science
  - Physics
  - Mathematics
  - Chemistry
  - Anthropology
- School of Veterinary Medicine
  - Veterinary Medicine

== Notable alumni ==
- Aloha Núñez, politician
