= Luz Vidal =

Mapuche Chilean union leader and politician (born 1973)

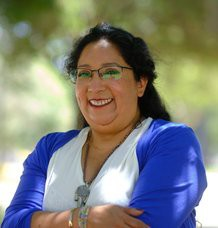
- Official portrait, 2022

Undersecretary for Women and Gender Equality of Chile
- In office 11 March 2022 – 28 March 2025
- President: Gabriel Boric
- Preceded by: María José Abud
- Succeeded by: Claudia Donaire Gaete

Personal details
- Born: Luz Pascuala Vidal Huiriqueo; 24 December 1973 (age 52) Mapuche community of Curruhuinca Vidal, Padre Las Casas, Chile
- Party: Independent
- Other political affiliations: Apruebo Dignidad
- Education: University of La Frontera

Luz Pascuala Vidal Huiriqueo (born 24 December 1973) is a Mapuche Chilean domestic worker, union leader, and politician. Between March 2022 and March 2025, she served as Undersecretary for Women and Gender Equality under the administration of President Gabriel Boric.

== Early life ==
Vidal was born on 24 December 1973 in the Mapuche community of Curruhuinca Vidal, Padre Las Casas, Chile. Her parents, who were farm workers, spoke Mapuche, but they didn't instill it in their children. She attended primary school at Escuela Lenfuen G-490 and secondary school at Liceo Pablo Neruda in Temuco, where she witnessed and intervened in acts of discrimination against her Mapuche classmates.

In 1994, Vidal began studying History Education at the University of La Frontera, but had to drop out in 1997 due to health problems.

== Trade union career ==
After working in various jobs, in 1998 Vidal moved to Santiago de Chile in search of better job opportunities and began working as a domestic worker for a justice of the Supreme Court, work that she carried out over several years in various homes. In 2008, she had an accident at work after falling down some stairs in a house she was cleaning in Las Condes. Her employers did not provide her with medical attention and told her she had to continue working. Co-workers from neighboring houses recommended that she go to the Sindicato Interempresas de Trabajadoras de Casa Particular (Inter-Company Union of Domestic Workers, Sintracap) to defend her labor rights. Due to her father's illness, she soon returned to her community. There, she joined the Folil Araucanía Cooperative, made up of Mapuche women who promoted and sold indigenous art, and where Luz Vidal learned how to weave and make leather goods.

Vidal succeeded Ruth Olate as president of Sintracap in 2019. The night before Labor Day 2020, she and other union members were arrested after gathering. The next day, they called for a demonstration due to the number of layoffs resulting from the COVID-19 pandemic in Chile. She was succeeded as president by María Cotal Neíra before 2022.

=== Political activity ===
As an independent politician, Vidal was part of the Apruebo Dignidad list by the Democratic Revolution quota to the Constitutional Convention election of 2021 representing 9th district.

During her campaign, she advocated for the new Constitution to have a gender perspective and recognize domestic and care work, as well as secular education and the visibility of Chile's indigenous peoples. Vidal received 5,895 votes (1.86%), so she was not elected.

After the election of Gabriel Boric in 2021 as the new President of Chile, Vidal was appointed Undersecretary for Women and Gender Equality of Chile of the Ministry of Women and Gender Equality. She was sworn in on 11 March 2022. She resigned in March 2025 and was succeeded on 28 March 2025.
