= National Council to Prevent Discrimination =

- Consejo Nacional para Prevenir La Discriminación (CONAPRED)
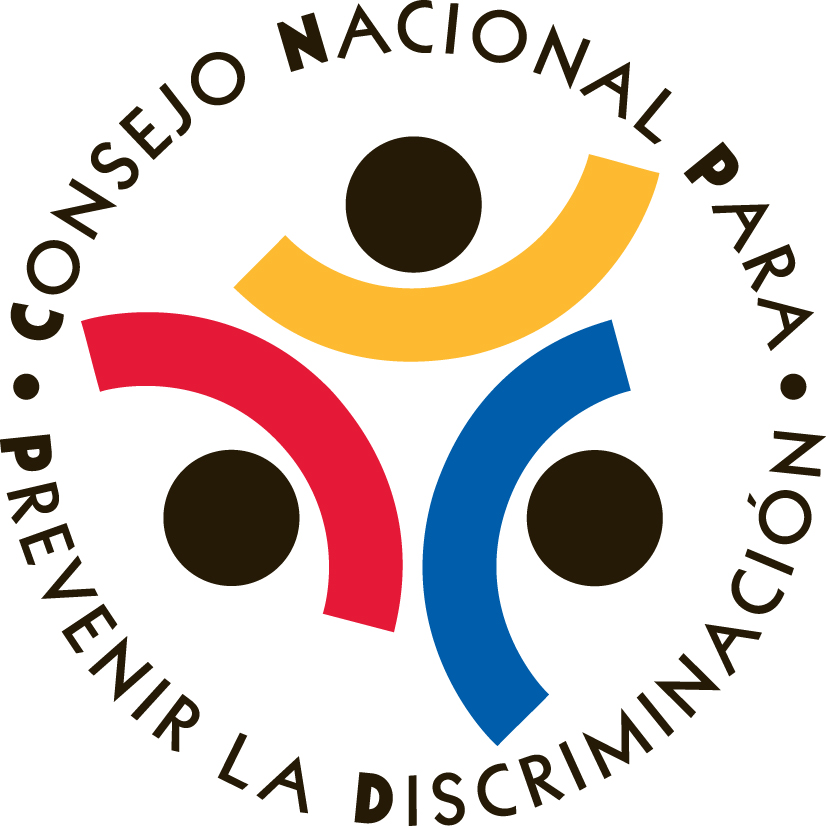
- CONAPRED logo

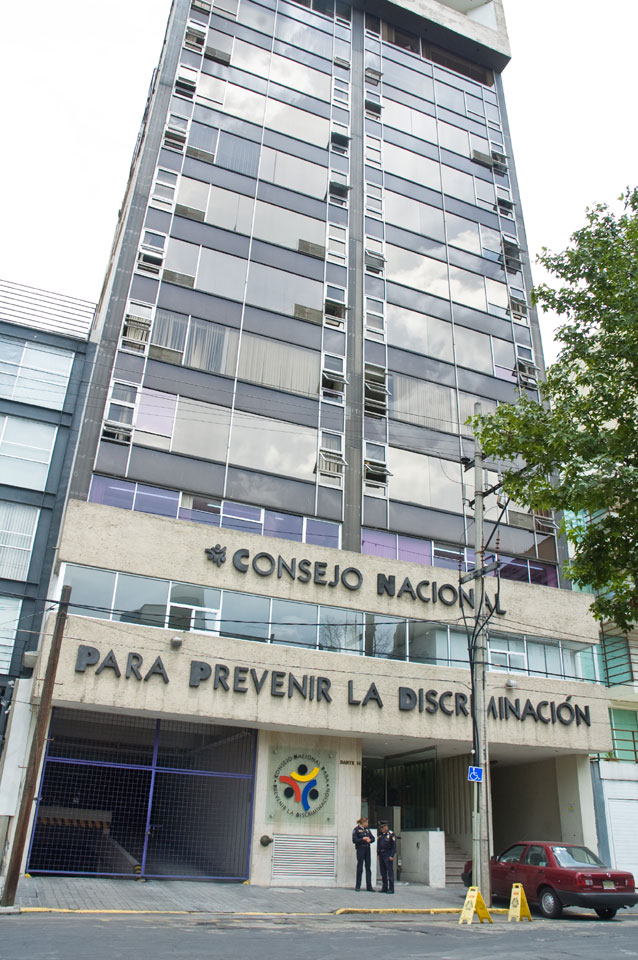
- CONAPRED Headquarters in 2012

Agency overview
- Formed: 29 April 2003
- Type: Federal
- Jurisdiction: Mexico
- Headquarters: Dante No 14 Colonia Anzures, Miguel Hidalgo, 11590 Mexico City, Mexico; 19.42646°N 99.17800°W
- Agency executive: Claudia Morales Reza, President
- Parent agency: Secretariat of the Interior
- Website: conapred.org.mx

The National Council to Prevent Discrimination (Spanish: Consejo Nacional para Prevenir La Discriminación; CONAPRED) is a Mexican government agency created in 2003 by Federal Law to Prevent and Eliminate Discrimination and to promote policies and measures to contribute to the cultural and social development and progress in social inclusion and guarantee the right to equality.

== Scope ==
The National Council to Prevent Discrimination is the independent governing body within the Secretariat of the Interior tasked with promoting policies and measures to contribute to the cultural and social development and progress in social inclusion and guarantee the right to equality, which is the first of the fundamental rights in the Constitution of Mexico.

The council is responsible for receiving and resolving complaints of alleged discriminatory acts committed by private individuals or federal authorities in the exercise of their functions. The council also takes actions to protect all citizens from "exclusion based on ethnic or national origin, sex, age, disability, social or economic status, health, pregnancy, language, religion, opinions, sexual orientation, marital status, or any other to prevent or defeat the recognition or exercise of rights and real equality of opportunity for people".

== History ==
The National Council to Prevent Discrimination created by Federal Law to Prevent and Eliminate Discrimination, was adopted on 29 April 2003, and published in the Official Journal of the Federation (DOF) on 11 June of that year. The latest amendment to the law was published in the Journal on 27 November 2007.

Together with the Secretariat of Social Development (SEDESOL), the council conducted a National Survey on Discrimination in 2005 to systematically collect information on the state of intolerance in Mexico. It was the first survey of its kind in the country.

== Governance ==
=== Board of Governors ===
The board of governors serves as the governing body of the council and includes representatives of these entities:

| Member | Status | Notes |
|---|---|---|
| Mexican Institute of Youth | Permanent guest | |
| National Center for the Prevention and Control of HIV / AIDS | Permanent guest | |
| National Commission for the Development of Indigenous Peoples | Permanent guest | |
| National Council for Development and Inclusion of Persons with Disabilities | Permanent guest | |
| National Institute of Older Persons | Permanent guest | |
| National Migration Institute | Permanent guest | |
| National System for Integral Family Development | Permanent guest | |
| National Women's Institute | Permanent member | |
| Secretariat of Finance and Public Credit | Permanent member | |
| Secretariat of Health | Permanent member | |
| Secretariat of Labor and Social Welfare | Permanent member | |
| Secretariat of Public Education | Permanent member | |
| Secretariat of Social Development | Permanent member | |
| Secretariat of the Interior | Permanent member | |

=== Presidents ===
Presidents of the National Council to Prevent Discrimination, who also chair the Board of Governors, is appointed by the head of the Mexican Federal Government. Presidents of the council have included:

- Gilberto Rincón Gallardo
  11 July 2003 - 30 August 2008
- Perla Patricia Bustamante Corona
  11 December 2008 - 30 November 2009
- Ricardo Antonio Bucio Mujica
  1 December 2009 - December 2015
- Alexandra Haas Pacuic

December 2015 – Present day
