= Ramón Paz Ipuana =

Wayuu-Venezuelan writer and linguist

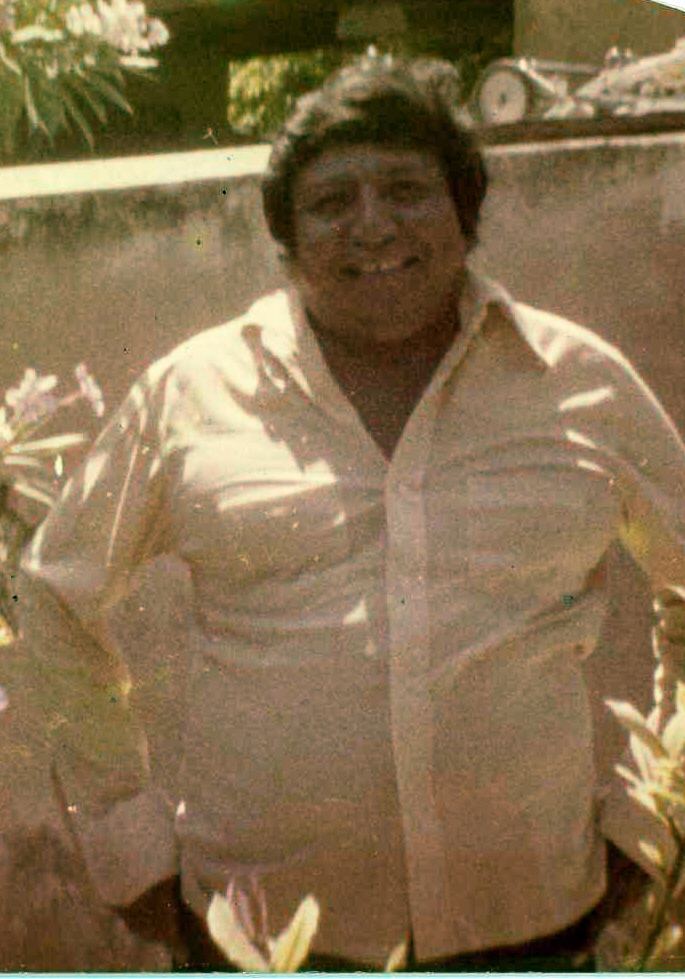
- Ramón Paz Ipuana in July 2018
- Born: December 17, 1937; Yosuitpa, Venezuela
- Died: October 27, 1992 (aged 54); Paraguaipoa, Venezuela
- Occupations: Poet, teacher, writer, and linguist
- Writing career
- Genres: Poetry, Short stories

Ramón Paz Ipuana (December 17, 1937 in Yosuitpa – October 27, 1992 in Paraguaipoa) was a Venezuelan writer, researcher, linguist and poet of Wayuu origin. He is considered one of the most important writers in the Wayuu language.

== Biography ==
Paz Ipuana worked in the Normal School of Maracaibo forming intercultural bilingual Wayuunaiki-Spanish teachers. After his death in 1992, his daughters Neima, Neida, Mayui, and Esmeralda continued publishing his works based on the manuscripts of traditional Wayuu stories he left.

== Works ==
- Mitos, leyendas y cuentos guajiros (1973). Instituto Agrario Nacional – Programa de Desarrollo Indígena.
- El Conejo y el Mapurite (1979). Ediciones Ekaré, ISBN 9789802570065.
- El Burrito y la Tuna (1979). Ediciones Ekaré. ISBN 9802570311.
- La Capa del Morrocoy (1982). Ediciones Ekaré. ISBN 9802570702
- La leyenda de Waleker (2007). Ministerio del Poder Popular para la Educación. ISBN 9789800201480
- Ale'eya. Cosmovisión wayuu: Relatos sagrados, conceptos y descripciones de la cultura wayuu (2016). Fondo Editorial Wayuu Alaülayu.
