= Claudia Morales Reza =

Huichol Mexican community leader, teacher and civil servant (born 1979)

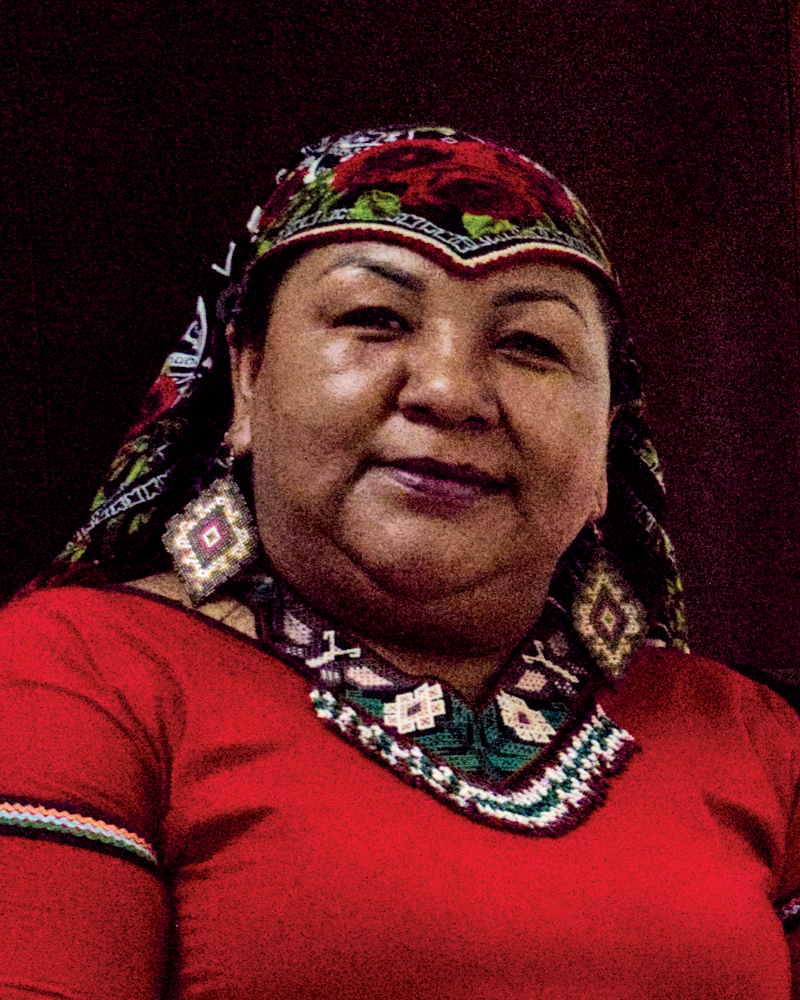
- Claudia Morales in 2023

President of the National Council to Prevent Discrimination
- In office 12 July 2022 – June 2026
- President: Andrés Manuel López Obrador; Claudia Sheinbaum
- Preceded by: Mónica Maccise Duayhe

Personal details
- Born: Utlama Ixtlán del Río, Nayarit, Mexico

Claudia Olivia Morales Reza (born Utlama) is a Huichol Mexican community leader, teacher, and civil servant. The president of the National Council to Prevent Discrimination (CONAPRED) between 2022 and 2026 , she is the first indigenous person to hold the position.

== Early life ==
Morales was born in Ixtlán del Río, Nayarit, into a Huichol (also Wixárika) family. Her birth name is "Utlama". At the age of nine the family moved to San Andrés Cohamiata, Jalisco, where her mother came from and is one of the main villages for the Huichol people. As a high school student, she experienced episodes of racism because of his skin color and the Huichol language she spoke. Morales began studying at the Escuela Normal de Educadoras de Guadalajara (Guadalajara Teacher Training College) and before completing her studies she found a job as a substitute teacher. She completed a professional technical degree in Art Education.

== Community career ==
In 2013, after sixteen years of teaching in rural areas, Morales left her job because her mother was elected deputy governor of the Huichol people and Morales began to get involved in community activities. In 2016, she was elected a member of its Council of Elders and later of its Communal Property Oversight Council.

Morales participated in negotiations over the territorial boundary dispute in Nayarit, as part of the community had been annexed to that state, and she confronted Governor of Jalisco Enrique Alfaro Ramírez to make the indigenous communities' claim known. She left this office in February 2020.

She has focused her activism on the fight for the defense of human rights, respect for and promotion of cultural identity, recognition of territory and sacred sites, preservation of culture, education, gender equality, and the rights of women and children.

In August 2020, after Mónica Maccise Duayhe was dismissed from CONAPRED, President Andrés Manuel López Obrador presented a shortlist of three women from indigenous communities to replace her as head of the institution: Claudia Morales Reza, Olga Santillán Rodríguez, and Mónica González.

She was sworn in on 12 March 2022, becoming the first indigenous person to reach this office. Her term finished in June 2026.
