= ECMIA =

Advocacy group for indigenous women of the Americas

- Continental Network of Indigenous Women of the Americas
- Enlace Continental de Mujeres Indígenas de las Américas
- Abbreviation: ECMIA
- Established: 1993
- Founded at: First Continental Meeting of Indigenous Women
- Type: Indigenous Peoples Organizations
- Official language: Spanish, English

The Continental Network of Indigenous Women of the Americas (Spanish: Enlace Continental de Mujeres Indígenas de las Américas) is an indigenous advocacy organization who promote the visibility of indigenous women and their rights.

The organization is made up from members from North America, South America, and Central America.
