= Kokama people =

Indigenous people of the Amazon

Kokama
Total population
- 21,000

Regions with significant populations
- Brazil, Peru, Colombia

The Kokama (also spelled Cocama, Portuguese: Cocamas) are an indigenous ethnic group of the Amazon that historically spoke the Cocama language. Today, the Kokama live in the countries of Peru, Brazil, and Colombia. In 2005, the known Kokama population was 786.

== Notable people ==
- Mari Luz Canaquiri Murayari, environmental activist, Time 100, Goldman Environmental Prize winner
- Lilia Isolina Java Tapayuri (born 1985), environmentalist
