= Aloha Núñez =

Venezuelan politician

Aloha Joselyn Núñez Gutiérrez
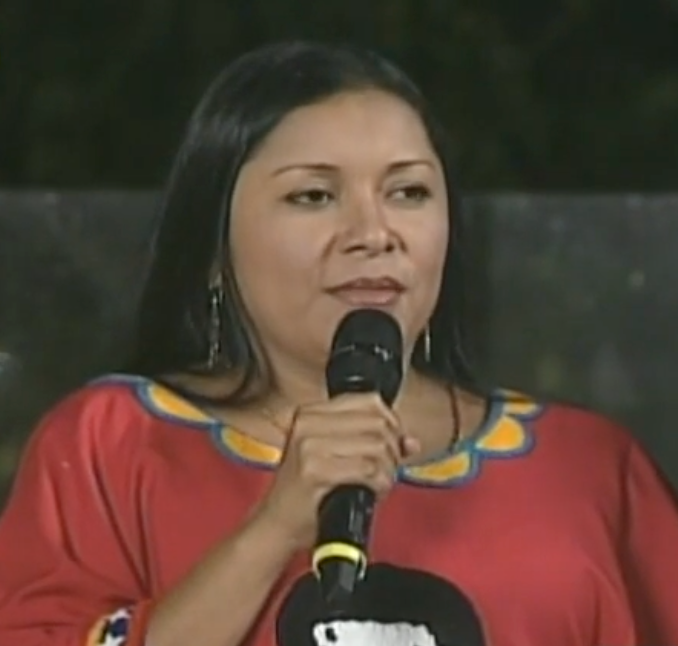
- In a 2015 interview

Minister of Indigenous Peoples of Venezuela
- In office 2012–2015
- President: Hugo Chávez; Nicolás Maduro
- Preceded by: Clara Vidal
- Succeeded by: Yamilet Mirabal

Personal details
- Born: 25 June 1983 (age 43) Maracaibo, Zulia, Venezuela
- Party: United Socialist Party of Venezuela (PSUV)
- Education: University of Zulia

Aloha Joselyn Núñez Gutiérrez (born 25 June 1983) is a Venezuelan politician of the United Socialist Party of Venezuela (PSUV). She served as the Minister of Indigenous Peoples of Venezuela between 2012 and 2015 in the National Assembly of Venezuela.

== Biography ==
Núñez was born on 25 June 1983 in Maracaibo, Zulia, Venezuela, and is of Wayúu descent. She studied at the University of Zulia.

Núñez was a member of the 2017 Constituent National Assembly of Venezuela, and served as the Minister of Indigenous Peoples in the National Assembly of Venezuela's Cabinet of Venezuela between 2012 and 2015. She was preceded as Minister by Clara Vidal [fr], was appointed by President Hugo Chávez and was ratified by President Nicolás Maduro after Chávez's death. Núñez also became Vice President of the Indigenous Peoples of the United Socialist Party of Venezuela (PSUV).

In 2020, Núñez was a candidate for deputy of the National Assembly in the state of Zulia, standing with the left-wing socialist and Chavista electoral alliance/popular front the Great Patriotic Pole (GPP).
