= United Socialist Party of Venezuela Youth =

Youth wing of United Socialist Party of Venezuela

United Socialist Party of Venezuela Youth Juventud del Partido Socialista Unido de Venezuela
- JPSUV logo with image of young Hugo Chávez
- Secretary General: Rodbexa Poleo
- Founded: 12 September 2008; 17 years ago
- Headquarters: Av. Libertador, Los Caobos, Parroquia El Recreo, Caracas
- Membership: ▲2,000,000+
- Ideology: Socialism of the 21st century Bolivarianism; Chavismo; Left-wing populism Anti-Imperialism
- Colours: Red
- Mother party: United Socialist Party of Venezuela
- International affiliation: WFDY
- Website: http://juventud.psuv.org.ve/

The United Socialist Party of Venezuela Youth (Spanish: Juventud del Partido Socialista Unido de Venezuela, JPSUV) is the youth wing of the United Socialist Party of Venezuela, which constitutes the initial scope of action of young people within the militant activity and under the party's guidelines.

== History ==
JPSUV was founded in Puerto Ordaz, in the state of Bolívar, on 12 September 2008.

=== Founding congress ===
Prior to the founding congress, in July 2008, 140,000 young militants from all over the country were organized to form 14,000 "youth work teams" in the "socialist battalions" of the United Socialist Party of Venezuela. In each work team, a youth representative was chosen in August 2008 for the "socialist circumscription" of the party, to attend as a delegate to the founding congress of the JPSUV, scheduled for the month of September, in accordance as approved by the National Political Direction of the PSUV.

The founding congress of the United Socialist Party of Venezuela Youth (JPSUV) was held between September 11 and 13, 2008 in the city of Puerto Ordaz, Bolívar state, with the participation of more than 1,400 delegates elected from all over the country and It was attended by international delegates from Latin America, Europe, Oceania and the United States.

== Membership ==
JPSUV has more than 2 million registered members aged between 15 and 30 years.

=== Affiliations ===
JPSUV is a member of the Young People of the Simon Bolivar Patriotic Pole. Internationally it is a member of the World Federation of Democratic Youth (FMJD).
