= Matut Impi Ismiño =

Aguarana Peruvian translator, educator and indigenous leader (born 1979)

Matut Micaela Impi Ismiño (born 1 November 1979) is an Aguarana Peruvian educator, translator, and indigenous leader, vice governor (waisam) of the Awajún Autonomous Territorial Government since 2022.

== Career ==
Impi was born on 1 November 1979 in the Aguarana (also Awajún) community of Belén, in the Departament of Amazonas, Peru from a family of Aguarana leaders. Her father was a teacher. From a young age, she was concerned about the lack of participation of women in the community. After finishing high school, she first studied computer science, but years later Impi began studying education and graduated as an educational psychologist in 2002.

In 2010, Impi began collaborating with the Federation of Awajún Communities of Río Santiago. She worked as a teacher in Nieva District and in 2015 moved to Lima to continue her studies, although she maintained her relationship with her community in Belén. In 2016, together with other Aguarana, she founded the Awajún People's Association in Lima (AJUTAP), where she was elected vice president. During the first lockdown due to the COVID-19 pandemic in Peru in 2020, Impi organized a collection to provide basic foodstuffs to the indigenous people who were in the capital. Years later, Impi began working at the Ministry of Culture's Center for Interpretation and Translation of Indigenous and Native Languages, since she obtained her certificate as an interpreter and translator of the Awajún language. In 2021, she returned to Nieva, from where she continued working for this center, finishing that same year.

In December 2021, at the Awajún Autonomous Territorial Government founding assembly that took place between 17 and 18 December, Impi was elected vice governor (waisam) with majority support. For this reason, she moved to Chiriaco, where the Territorial Government headquarters are located. One of the first measures she took was to create the Awajún Women's Dialogue Congress, which has developed nine ordinances that seek to improve bilingual education opportunities, promote reforestation, strengthen the culture and language, freedom of choice of partners for women, legal recognition of marriages celebrated in the community, and education for girls. Input, as vice governor, also focuses on promoting women's participation in community decision-making. She also started her first workshop for indigenous leaders.

Following a complaint filed by Impi, in 2023 the Superior Court of Justice of Amazonas ruled that the Condorcanqui Women's Emergency Center must implement an interpretation service in the Awajún and Wampis languages for women of those ethnic groups who come to seek support and do not speak Spanish. Impi stated that this “represents a major step forward in enabling our sisters to access their rights without communication barriers” and “a historic precedent in the inclusion of our languages and cultures".

In 2022, she spoke out on the Peruvian government's proposal to tackle illegal mining, jointly requesting, along with other representatives of the Awajún Autonomous Territorial Government, a letter to the United Nations asking it to mediate between the Peruvian and Ecuadorian states.
