= Chiriaco River =

Coordinates: 5.1458°S 78.3297°W

Location
- Country: Peru

Physical characteristics
- Mouth: Marañón

The Chiriaco (from Quechua Chiri Yaku, chiri cold, yaku water, "cold water") is a river in Peru. It is a tributary of the Marañón and takes the Tuntungos, Shushug and Wawas as principal tributaries.

In 2016, a large oil spill from Petroperú's pipeline contaminated the Chiriaco.
