= Dominga Neculmán =

Mapuche ceramist (1937–2022)

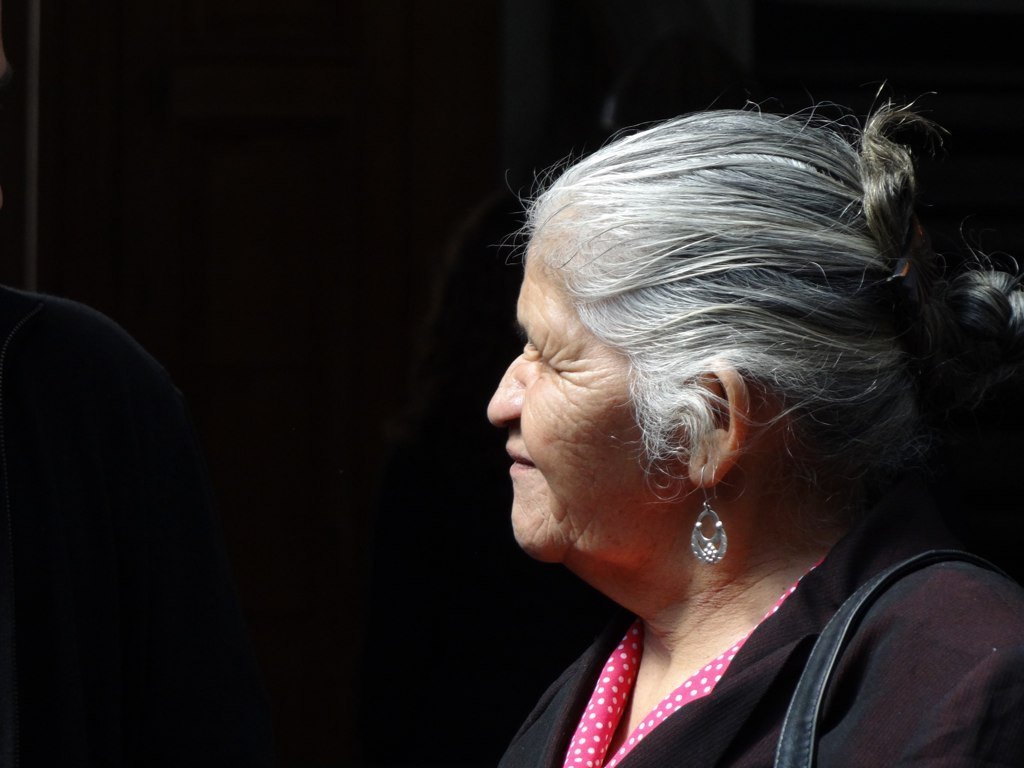
- Dominga Neculmán in 2011
- Born: 1937; Padre Las Casas, Araucania, Chile
- Died: 5 December 2022 (aged 84–85); Padre Las Casas, Araucania, Chile
- Citizenship: Mapuche and Chilean
- Style: wizüfe
- Movement: Indigenous ceramics of the Americas
- Awards: Lorenzo Berg Award (1986), Living Human Treasure (Chile, 2011), Illustrious Daughter of Padre Las Casas (2022)

Dominga Neculmán Mariqueo (1937 – 5 December 2022) was a Mapuche Chilean ceramist, who was declared Chile's Living Human Treasure in 2011 for her mastery and promotion of the traditional Mapuche pottery technique, wizüfe.

== Early life ==
Neculmán was born in 1937 in the Mapuche community of Juan Mariqueo, in the rural village of Roble Huacho, Padre Las Casas, Chile. She grew up with her mother and grandmother, both of whom were potters. Neculmán wanted to learn the craft from an early age, but her mother refused because of the hard work involved, so she learned the witral weaving technique with sheep wool instead.

== Artistic career ==
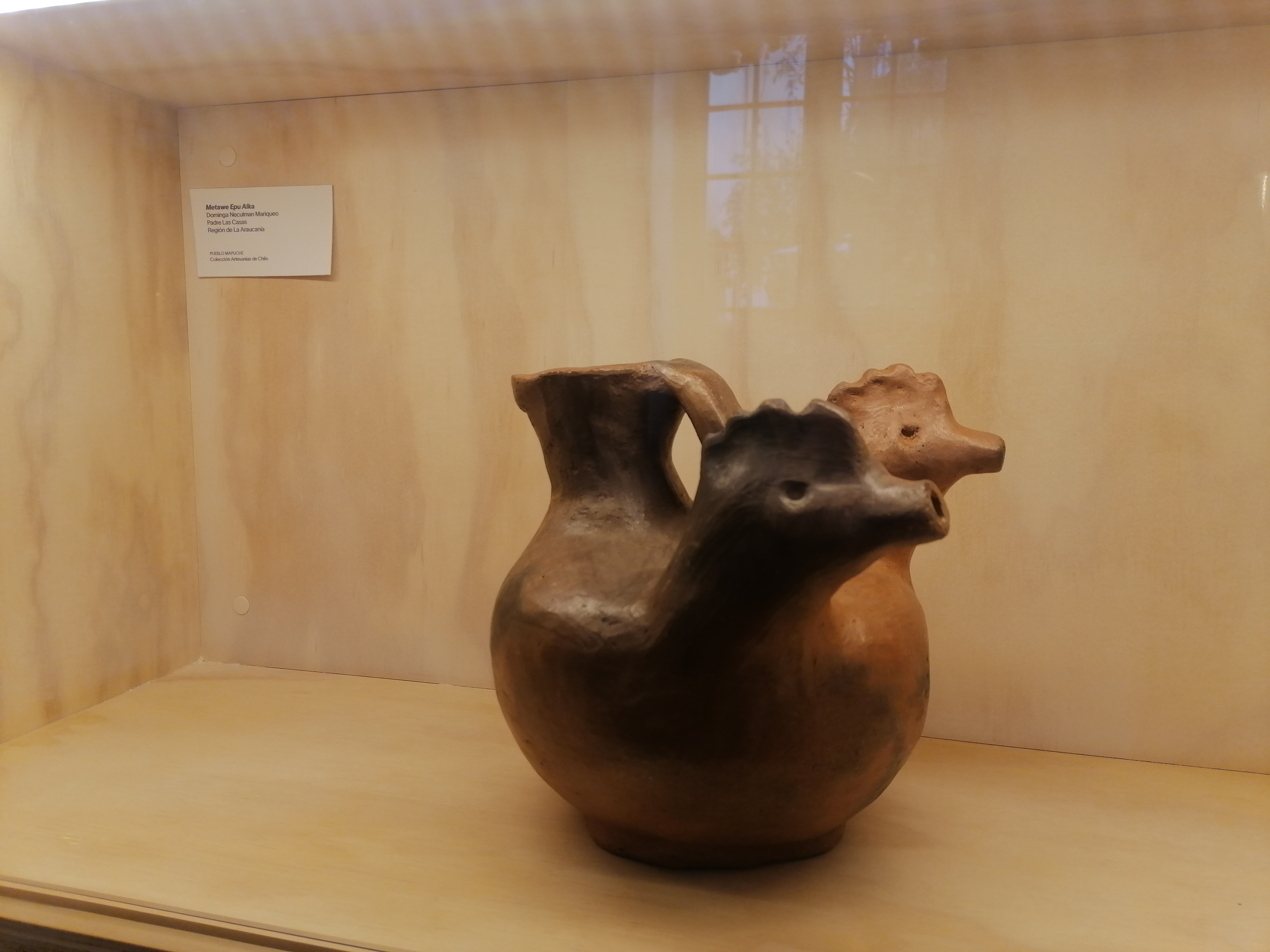
Metawe Epu Alka, a double-headed bird ceramic jar by Dominga Neculmán (Mapuche)

After his mother died at the age of 33, Neculmán began practising pottery thanks to what she had observed at home and by learning from other master potters of the region. Neculmán soon became well known and attracted the attention of researchers and academics who saw her as having a special technique.

Neuclmán's technique was characterised by the almost exclusive use of her hands and materials such as clay (or üku) and loam (or raq).

== Language advocacy ==
Neculmán also taught mapudungún language in the Intercultural Bilingual Education programme at the Temuco Catholic University and participated in the Mapuche Ceramics course at the Catholic University of Chile.

== Awards and honors ==
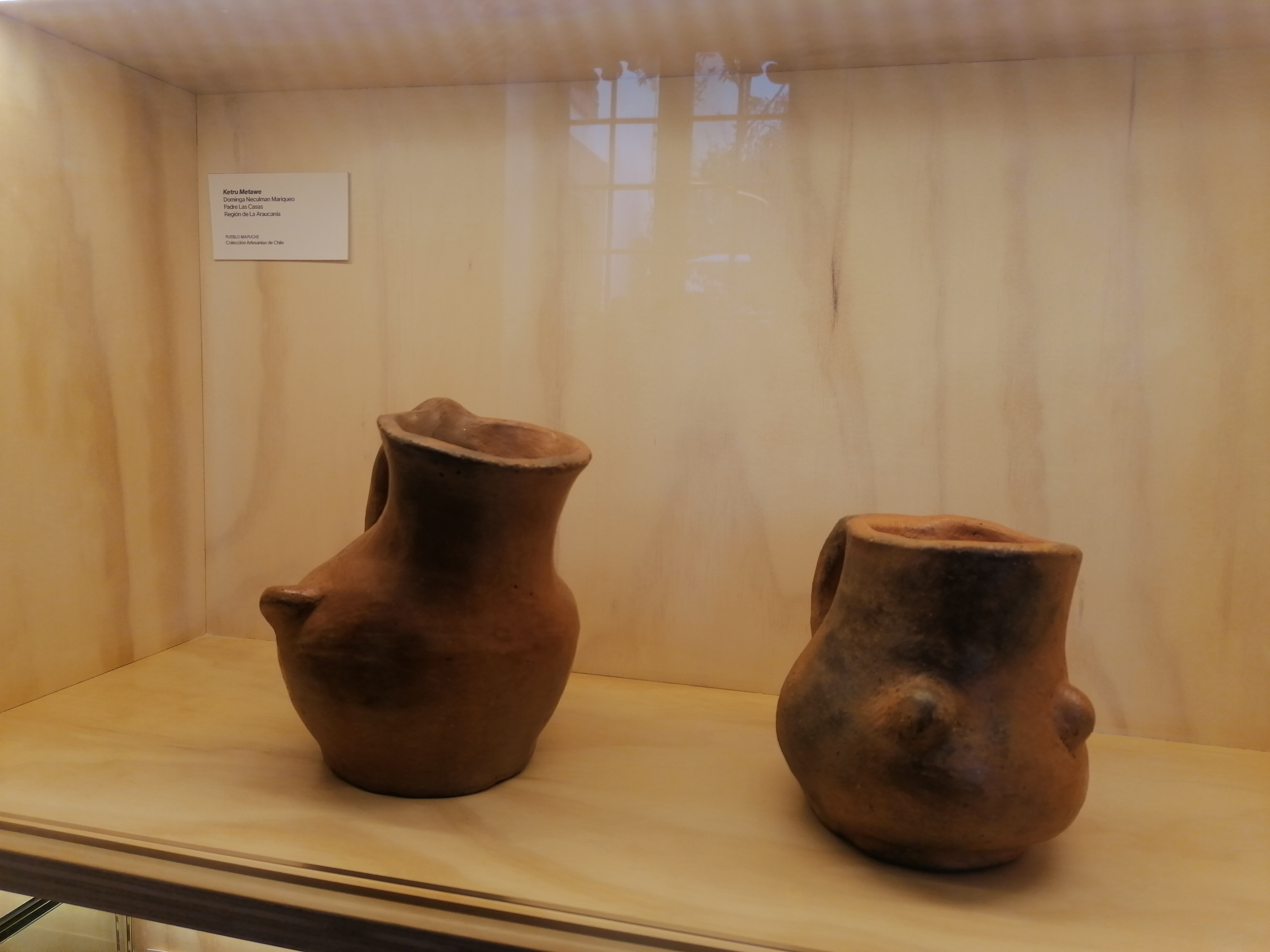
Two redware jars, Ketru metawe, by Dominga Neculmán, part of the Colección de Artesanías de Chile

In 1986, the Catholic University of Chile gave Neculmán the Lorenzo Berg Award for Best National Craftswoman.

The Chilean Ministry of Culture named her a Living Human Treasure in 2011 for her extensive knowledge of the art of pottery.

In March 2022, she was officially declared an illustrious daughter of Padre Las Casas alongside epewtufe (storyteller) Paula Painén.

== Death and legacy ==
Neculmán died on 5 December 2022 and was one of the last masters of the Mapuche pottery technique.
