= Francisca Linconao =

Mapuche leader in Chile

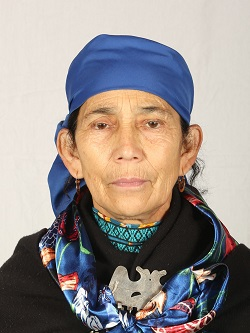

Member of the Constitutional Convention of Chile
- In office July 4, 2021 – July 4, 2022

Personal details
- Born: Francisca Linconao Huircapán; 18 September 1958 (age 67) Padre Las Casas, Chile
- Occupation: Machi

Francisca Linconao Huircapán (born September 18, 1958), also known as Machi Linconao, is a machi (a Mapuche spiritual authority) and human rights activist in Chile. She became the first Indigenous rights defender in Chile to successfully invoke the 1989 Indigenous and Tribal Peoples Convention when she sued to stop a company from logging a forest adjacent to her community. In 2021, she was elected as a representative of the Mapuche people to the Chilean Constitutional Convention election.

== Early life ==
Linconao was born in Padre Las Casas, Chile, in 1958. She was one of nine children, and her father died when she was a baby. Despite her initial hesitation, wanting to stay in school, at age 12 she became a machi, a Mapuche traditional healer and religious leader. She went on to become both a spiritual leader and a human rights defender for the Mapuche people.

== Machi Linconao v. Palermo ==
In 2008, she submitted a protection action known as an Action of Rights Protection against Sociedad Palermo Ltd., owned by the Taladriz family, to stop the company from illegally felling trees and shrubs of the native forest along the slopes of Cerro Rahue and replacing them with pine trees. The trees and shrubs were located within the Palermo Chico farm, next to her community. The logging was affecting not only the Cerro Rahue ecosystem but also a wetland known as a menoko that Linconao and her people consider sacred.

In 2009, the Temuco Court of Appeals ruled in Linconao's favor, a ruling that was upheld by the Supreme Court. It was the first judgement in Chile that took into consideration the 1989 Indigenous and Tribal Peoples Convention of the International Labour Organization, making Linconao the first Indigenous rights defender in the country to successfully invoke the convention.

== Luchsinger-Mackay case ==
In 2013, Linconao was one of the Mapuches linked to the Luchsinger-Mackay case, in which a couple, Werner Luchsinger and Vivianne Mackay, died in a house fire that was blamed on arson amid the Mapuche conflict. Linconao was arrested in the afternoon on the day of the fire. She was accused of terrorism and illegal arms possession. Authorities alleged an improvised shotgun was found at her home during a raid, but during her trial the official who had supposedly found the shotgun in her home never testified, and no one could even recall his name. The court dismissed the charges, acquitted Linconao, and ordered she be compensated.

On March 1, 2016, she was imprisoned and faced a new judicial process for the same charges. She began a hunger strike on December 22, 2016, after spending nine months in pretrial detention. Fourteen days later, she ended her hunger strike after the Temuco Court of Appeals allowed her to leave pretrial detention and instead be put under house arrest.

On August 22, 2017, the World Organisation Against Torture's Observatory for the Protection of Human Rights Defenders, the International Federation for Human Rights, and the Chilean organization Observatorio Ciudadano issued a statement of concern about using the Chilean Anti-Terrorist Law against Linconao and 10 other Mapuche community members.

The Oral Criminal Tribunal in Temuco acquitted Linconao on October 18, 2017. But then, on December 29, 2017, the Temuco Court of Appeals annulled that decision, ordering the reopening of the case. Eventually, on May 10, 2018, she was acquitted of all the charges against her.

== Chilean Constitutional Convention ==
In January 2021, Linconao gathered the required signatures to become a candidate for the 2021 Chilean Constitutional Convention election, running to represent District 23 of the Araucanía Region, and as a representative of the Mapuche people.

In the constituent election held in Chile on May 15–16, 2021, she obtained 83.51% of the votes where there were votes from the Mapuche people, becoming the candidate with the most votes among Indigenous peoples. Thus, she was elected as one of the seven Mapuche representatives in the Constitutional Convention.

Early reports suggested that Francisca Linconao was seen as "the natural candidate" for indigenous members of the Constitutional Convention to support for president of the body. However, Linconao declined to run, instead proposing that Elisa Loncón stand for the presidency of the convention during a Winter solstice meeting held in her house in Padre Las Casas. Loncón agreed to run for the presidency, and was elected on 4 July 2021 after the convention was inaugurated.
