= Zacarías Colque =

Bolivian politician (1967–2022)

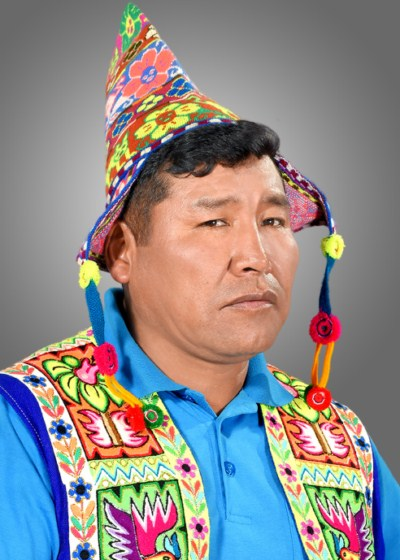
- Official portrait, 2017

Member of the Chamber of Deputies from Potosí circumscription 38
- In office 18 January 2015 – 3 November 2020
- Substitute: Eunecia López
- Preceded by: Richard Cordel (Note: Redistribution; circumscription 40.)
- Succeeded by: Gladys Chumacero
- Constituency: Bilbao; Bustillo; Charcas; Ibáñez

Personal details
- Born: Zacarías Colque Matías; 8 February 1967 Caripuyo, Potosí, Bolivia
- Died: 24 September 2022 (aged 55)
- Party: Movement for Socialism
- Occupation: Agricultural worker; politician; trade unionist

Zacarías Colque Matías (8 February 1967 – 24 September 2022) was a Bolivian agricultural worker, politician, and trade unionist who served as a member of the Chamber of Deputies from Potosí, representing circumscription 38 from 2015 to 2020. A member of the Movement for Socialism, Colque built his career in northern Potosí's rural trade syndicates. The party's long-established alliance with the agrarian sector facilitated Colque's entry into politics, first as a member of the Caripuyo Municipal Council and much later as a parliamentarian.

== Early life and career ==
Zacarías Colque was born on 8 February 1967 in Caripuyo, a rural locality situated in the Alonso de Ibáñez Province of northern Potosí, one of the most isolated and least economically developed regions in the country, home to the nation's most impoverished municipality: the very same Caripuyo. An ethnic Quechua, Colque spent his early life in rural poverty, making a living as an agricultural worker before becoming active in the regional's peasant labor movement.

Colque progressively climbed the ranks of northern Potosí's agrarian trade syndicates, starting at the local level as general secretary of a small union in Huanacoma, then at the municipal as executive secretary of Caripuyo's sectional workers' center. These positions opened the door to more prominent roles, and he topped off his union career as executive secretary of the Unified Syndical Federation of Native Workers of Northern Potosí.

== Chamber of Deputies ==
=== Election ===
As a leader in Potosí's agrarian syndicates, Colque represented a confluence of social movements: organized labor first and foremost, but also the peasantry, as well as the indigenous movement. The organic alliance between these three groups with the nascent Movement for Socialism (MAS-IPSP) facilitated Colque's entry into politics. Having served as president of the MAS's branch in Caripuyo, he achieved his first elective position locally, serving as a member and eventual president of the Caripuyo Municipal Council.

Absent from ensuing election cycles, Colque returned to the political scene in 2014, with his nomination for a seat in the Chamber of Deputies. He ran to represent the MAS in Potosí's circumscription 38, encompassing the department's northern provinces. In one of the bastions of electoral support for the party, Colque won without any significant competition.

=== Tenure ===
In office, Colque focused his parliamentary term on indigenous matters, supporting projects to recognize and promote native culture and occupying positions on committees related to the topic. He held a seat on the Planning Commission's Indigenous Jurisdiction Committee and chaired both the Indigenous Peoples and Nations Committee and the Cultures Committee, the former for two terms and the latter for one. As with the vast majority of legislators who entered parliament in representation of MAS-aligned groups, Colque was not nominated for reelection, reflecting the party's practice of renewing its electoral lists to make way for new leaders from allied social sectors. He died shortly after leaving office, on 24 September 2022.

=== Commission assignments ===
- Plural Economy, Production, and Industry Commission
  - Rural Native Indigenous Jurisdiction Committee (2015–2016)
- Rural Native Indigenous Peoples and Nations, Cultures, and Interculturality Commission
  - Cultures, Interculturality, and Cultural Heritage Committee (Secretary: 2018–2019)
  - Rural Native Indigenous Peoples and Nations Committee (Secretary: 2016–2017, 2019–2020)
- Amazon Region, Land, Territory, Water, Natural Resources, and Environment Commission
  - Amazon Region, Land, and Territory Committee (2017–2018)

== Electoral history ==
Electoral history of Zacarías Colque
Year	Office	Party	Votes			Result	Ref.
Year	Office	Party	Total	%	P.	Result	Ref.
2004	Sub. Councillor	Movement for Socialism	2,358	91.83%	1st	Won	(Note: Presented on an electoral list. The data shown represents the share of the vote the entire party/alliance received in that constituency.)
2014	Deputy	Movement for Socialism	25,954	71.98%	1st	Won	
Source: Plurinational Electoral Organ | Electoral Atlas

Chamber of Deputies of Bolivia
Preceded by Richard Cordel	Member of the Chamber of Deputies from Potosí circumscription 38; 2015–2020	Succeeded by Gladys Chumacero
