= Rodrigo Callapina =

Rodrigo Sutiq Callapiña was a native Inca who successfully claimed his nobility in colonial Spanish America in 1569.

== Overview ==
In the late 16th century, the Spanish developed a political system that depended heavily on the social status and prestige of the individual. Natives who were not nobility were expected to pay taxes, perform public labor, and personal service for the Spanish. Because of this pressure Incan natives began to manipulate both the legal system and their traditional mythology to prove their noble lineage. In 1569, Rodrigo Sutiq Callapiña successfully claimed his nobility by linking his bloodline to Manqo Qhapaq and Qoya Qori Kuka. Manqo Qhapaq was the mythic ancient Inka ancestor, known as the first Inka, and Qoya Qori Kuka was a great female warrior who defended Cuzco and was later imbued into a stone as a spiritual protector.

== The Callapiña document ==
The main document used to assess Rodrigo Sutiq Callapiña is called the Callapiña Document, which he gave to the Spanish to prove his noble lineage. The document mostly details testimony that was given in Cuzco in 1569. The original Callapiña document was later used by Rodrigo’s two grandsons, who also petitioned for noble status and had a copy of their grandfather's investigation as the main evidence for their petition. Callapiña had a total of eight witnesses testify to affirm his lineage. The witnesses ranged from 85 to 132 years old, and were already recognized as descendants of the Inka nobility in Cuzco.

The Callapiña Document is a document that reveals the connections between elite families in Cuzco and the sixteenth-century “reconstructions” of the mytho-historical tradition of the origin of Manqo Qhapaq. Rodrigo combined, in his ancestral claim (from his paternal ancestors), descent from both Tampu T’oqo and Sutiq T’oqo. Tampu T’oqo connected him to the Inka nobility in Cuzco, and Sutiq T’oqo linked him with an ayllu of the Maskas, a division of the Tambos ethnic group from the Pacarigtambo area. When trying to deconstruct the methodology used to claim nobility, it seems that the Inka origin myth was being manipulated among high-class individuals in Cuzco wishing to exploit the benefits that came with being represented by the Spanish colonial administrative system.

== Andean peoples and the Spanish administration ==
Rodrigo is an example of the way Andean people tactfully manipulated their traditional histories to take action through colonial procedures. By doing this, they were able to slightly shape the administrative system that was being forced upon them. This example runs counter to the myth that Andean natives being colonized were simply overtaken by the system. Rodrigo Callapiña instead demonstrates that Andean natives sought to weave themselves into the fabric of the newly imposed administration by finding and exploiting loopholes, and also creatively manipulating their own histories to better their own social standing.
