= Lilia Isolina Java Tapayuri =

Kokama Colombian indigenous leader and ambientalist (born 1985)

Lilia Isolina Java Tapayuri (born 1984 or 1985) is a Kokama Colombian environmentalist and community leader. She advocates for the conservation and protection of river wildlife of Tarapoto Lakes, in the Amazon Trapeze, in order to defend the rainforest and its ecosystem, as well as to protect the culture and ways of life of indigenous peoples.

She is also dedicated to monitoring the population of native species as the regional coordinator of Puerto Nariño for the Omacha Foundation.

== Environmental work ==
Java was born in 1984 or 1985 in San Francisco community, close to Puerto Nariño in Loretoyacu River, one of the tributaries of the Amazon River, and in a Kokama community. Ever since she was a child, Java has been fascinated by river wildlife, and, encouraged by her father, she helped care for the pink dolphins, an animal central to the community's imagination, in a male-dominated environment. In fact, her grandfather was already responsible for cataloging and protecting these dolphins.

Despite the evangelization that the community experienced in the last century, the people retained part of their indigenous animistic beliefs, which is why the protection of river fauna has an important spiritual connotation for Java.

Java's priority has been to combat overfishing in the Tarapoto Lakes, protect their river fauna, and ensure food sovereignty for their indigenous communities. After 20 years of working with indigenous authorities, institutions, and organizations, Java secured fishing agreements that respect the wetlands of the lakes and prohibit the use of large nets. Together with women from the 22 indigenous communities of the territory, she has monitored and supervised fishing to restore and conserve Amazonian ecosystems through ancestral indigenous knowledge. They have also managed to control illegal fishing.

All this community work led to the designation of the Tarapoto Lakes wetlands complex as a Ramsar site. Lilia Java stated that "the designation of the Tarapoto lakes as a Ramsar site is an opportunity to strengthen, protect, and conserve our natural, cultural, and social resources".

In 2019, with Fundación Omacha and Whitley Fund for Nature (WFN), Lilia Java launched a reforestation campaign for the “pepeaderos” gallery forest that grow on the banks of rivers and wetlands whose fruits, known as “pepas,” serve as food for birds and whose trees are used to build homes and boats for local communities. The second phase of the project with Conservation International consists of research to continue this recovery and the conservation of fish and aquatic mammal species.

In June 2021, Java and her colleagues received support from Conservation International to train in sustainable fishing through the Green Amazon program.

Lilia Java participated in an international meeting of indigenous women leaders from Amazonian countries in April 2022 in Quito, Ecuador, where socio-environmental projects developed in their communities were presented. She gave a talk on the "role of women in ancestral fishing practices and their participation in decision-making for the management of natural resources".

== Personal life ==
She is married to Aldo Curico with whom have three children.
