= Rocilda Nunta Guimaraes =

Shipibo-Conibo Peruvian indigenous leader and politician

Rocilda Nunta Guimaraes is a Shipibo-Conibo Peruvian indigenous leader and politician, Vice Minister of Interculturality of the Ministry of Culture between 2021 and 2023, becoming the first indigenous woman to reach a high civil position. She has also been one of the leaders of Interethnic Association for the Development of the Peruvian Rainforest (AIDESEP).

== Career ==
Nunta was born in Shiqibo-Conibo community of Nuevo San Rafael, in the district of Masisea in Department of Ucayali, Peru. She lived there until adolescence, when she moved to the Yarinacocha District and studied at a bilingual school. She trained to be a bilingual teacher of Spanish and Shipibo language, her mother tongue. She also obtained diplomas in Law and Territorial Management.

As a young woman, she was involved in indigenous movements and chaired the Organization of Indigenous Youth of the Ucayali Region (OJIRU), as well as leading indigenous radio programs. Her community activity focuses especially on the defense of indigenous women.

Nunta has worked in various public entities and NGOs, and participated in the prior consultation on the Climate Change Law Regulations, particularly in proposals related to the adaptation of indigenous women. She has also provided training for indigenous peoples and has worked in various public entities and NGOs, such as Interethnic Association for the Development of the Peruvian Rainforest, where she directed the Indigenous Women's Program until 2021.

On 5 November 2021, Minister of Culture Gisela Ortiz appointed Nunta as the new Vice Minister of Interculturality. Her appointment reflects President Pedro Castillo's commitment to appoint indigenous leaders to high-level government positions, and Nunta was the first indigenous woman to achieve this. This vice ministry is responsible for designing, coordinating, and implementing public policies for the inclusion of Peru's indigenous peoples. She resigned on 14 February 2023.
