= Luis Soto Colque =

Luis Alberto Soto Colque (Mejía, May 14, 1973) is a Peruvian biologist, sports journalist and communicator known for his soccer broadcasts in Cusco Quechua.

== Biography ==
Luis Alberto Soto Colque grew up in the department of Cusco and went to the Colegio Nacional Inmaculada Concepción (CNIC, high school) in Sicuani. He studied Biology at the National University of Saint Anthony the Abbot in Cuzco (UNSAAC).

Soto began to narrate news in Quechua in 2003, when Club Cienciano of Cusco beat Club Atletico River Plate of Buenos Aires to win the 2003 Copa Sudamericana. Soto was a communicator for Radio Mundo and had narrated exclusively in Spanish; and had narrated exclusively in Spanish; but when Cienciano won the cup, he began to speak in his mother tongue, Cusco Quechua. He decided to prepare a Quechua soccer vocabulary to narrate entire matches in the future.

In 2018, he narrated the World Cup in Russia (especially the matches with Peruvian participation) in Quechua, for which he had practiced for months with videos of soccer matches and adopted more than five hundred soccer terms from Spanish into Quechua. For the soccer ball, he created the term Qara Q'ompo ('leather ball'), which also became his nickname. Soto has also narrated women's soccer games.

In 2020, during the COVID-19 pandemic, when he was in quarantine in the community of Chumo in the district of Sicuani, he narrated traditional stories in the Quechua language and transmitted them online via Facebook.

Politics

In the 2018 regional elections, Soto ran for the Cusco regional government for the Partido Popular Cristiano (PPC), and ran in the 2022 elections, for the same position, for the Renovación Popular party.
