= Indio Mariano =

Mexican rebel

Indio Mariano was an Indigenous rebel against Spain in 1801 in Tepic, Nueva Galicia, now in the Mexican state of Nayarit.

== The background ==
With the arrival of the Bourbons on the throne of Spain in 1801 came a period of Indio Mariano, one of them serious, led by different men. The first of these took place in Tepic, Nueva Galicia, in January. The second occurred in September in Nuevo León.

== The first rebellion ==
Juan Hilario Rubio, an important man of Tepic, Alcalde José Desiderio Maldonado, and the Indigenous clerk Juan Francisco Medina were the leaders of the first Indio Mariano rebellion. These men circulated a proclamation for the crowning of a native of Tlaxcala as Rey de Indias Mariano Primero (Mariano I, king of the Indies). This was scheduled for January 6, 1801. Even before that date, some pueblos were in open rebellion against the Spanish.

The coronation, however, was frustrated. The Spanish officials were able to assemble a force of 762 men and 8 pieces of artillery, relying largely on the local militia and the fleet in the harbor at San Blas. For the place and time, this was an overwhelming force.

The three leaders and many other persons were taken prisoner. Many prisoners were taken in two "battles", one on January 5 and one on that day or shortly thereafter. The Indigenous offered little resistance, and casualties were minimal. The rebellion seemed to be over by January 8, but the following week a second wave appeared. The Spanish forces suffered setbacks. Large groups of armed Indians were seen in many places, converging on Tepic. The Spanish were forced to withdraw from various villages. They, too converged on Tepic.

Alarming rumors began to circulate — that 5,000 Yaquis were approaching; that 6,000 to 7,000 Yumas were coming from the Colorado River. The rebellion and rumours greatly alarmed viceregal officials in Mexico City, particularly since the mother country, and therefore also the colony, was at war with Great Britain. They began to fear the possibility of a general Indian uprising, perhaps simultaneously with a British invasion.

The fears were relieved the following week. Reports contradicted the rumours of massive movements of warriors. Other reports arrived telling of Indians returning peacefully to their villages. On January 19, Captain Leonardo Pintado dispersed a group of armed rebels, taking 33 prisoners. The emergency came to an end. The Spanish had taken approximately 300 prisoners.

Most of those arrested were sent to Guadalajara. However, some died in jail in Tepic of an unknown disease, some on the march to Guadalajara, and some after arriving in Guadalajara. Some of the Spanish troops also suffered from the disease, and some of them died. Juan Hilario Rubio was one of the rebels who died in Guadalajara. He was condemned postmortem to confiscation of his property, demolition of his house, and sowing of his fields with salt. The two other leaders were condemned to six years of public labor in Veracruz. This was a sentence that often proved fatal. Most of the other surviving prisoners were released.

Indio Mariano (also known as Máscara de Oro, or Golden Mask) was never crowned. He was apparently a young Indian itinerant beggar who showed up in Tepic shortly before Christmas 1800 in the company of an old mulatto and a child. He claimed to be the son of a deceased governor of Tlaxcala, and to have grown up in luxury. It may not have been true that Indio Mariano was a native of Tlaxcala in a literal sense. For the Indian resistance of the time, claiming a relationship to Tlaxcala was asserting a claim to the special rights granted to the Indigenous of that place by Hernán Cortés at the time of the Conquest. Indio Mariano was never found. However, rights and titles claimed in connection with Tlaxcalla persisted up until the time of the first Mexican Empire and may have even played a significant role in motivating some natives to side with the conservative forces during the French Intervention. There has been speculation that the "Promise of Tlaxcalla" may have played a part in the Cristero Rebellion, due in part to the belief that the catholic rebels were awaiting pontifical approval before crowning an official "Prince of Tlaxcalla" as heir to a "Kingdom of the Aztecs" in fulfillment of the Tlaxcalla Compact. One has to believe that the Tlaxcalla Compact may have given rise to the chicano legend of the return of the Quetzalcuatl to unify a broken Aztlan. Quetzalcuatl is the chief deity of the allied Aztec tribes who unified themselves under Tlaxcalla and the Spanish, when they liberated Cholula from Mexican control, leading up to the conquest of Tenochtitlan.

== The second "rebellion" ==
On September 1, 1801, in Nuevo León, an Indian by the name of Juan José García was apprehended stealing cattle. He told the authorities he was Mariano I or Alejandro I. These were names of kings. Mariano asserted that his royal birth and ancestry were documented by papal certificates that he had personally obtained in Rome. His case was transferred to the royal medical tribunal, where he was diagnosed as mentally ill with melancholia. He was ordered to the hospital of San Hipólito for treatment.
