= Demographics of Ecuador =

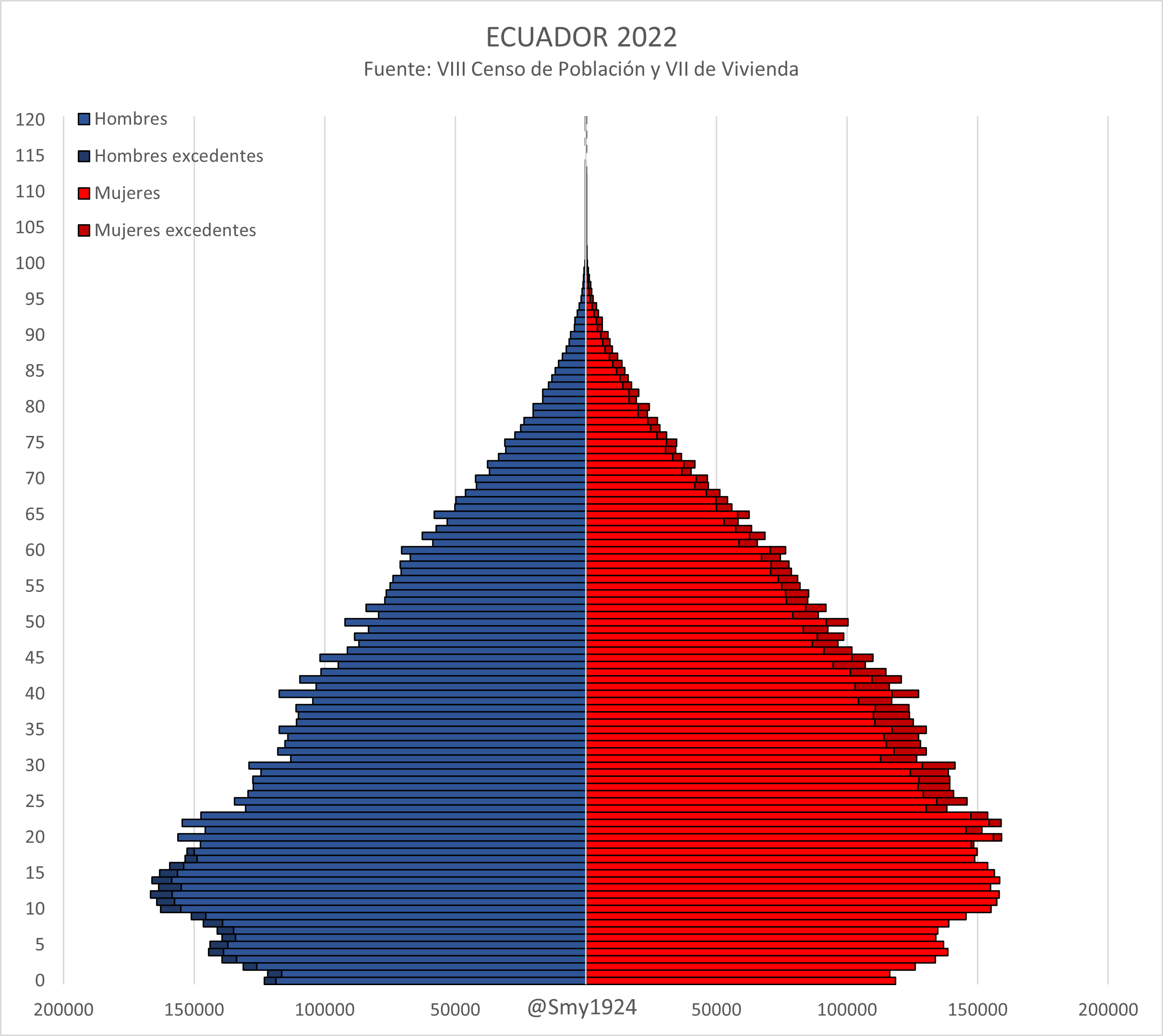
- Ecuador population pyramid in 2022
- Population: 18,468,682 (August 24, 2026)
- Growth rate: 1.443% (2011 est.)
- Birth rate: 11.5 births/1,000 population (2025 est.)
- Death rate: 5.0 deaths/1,000 population (2024 est.)
- Fertility rate: 1.60 children born/woman (2025 est.)
- Immigrant share: 4.1% (2024)

Age structure
- 0–14 years: 28.23%
- 15–64 years: 64.11%
- 65 and over: 7.66%

Nationality
- Nationality: Ecuadorian
- Major ethnic: Mixed (85.17%); Mestizos (77.47%); Montubios (7.70%)
- Minor ethnic: Indigenous (7.69%); Blacks (4.81%); Whites (2.21%); Others (0.12%)

Language
- Spoken: Spanish, other indigenous languages.

Demographic features of the population of Ecuador include population density, ethnicity, education level, health of the populace, economic status, religious affiliations and other aspects of the population.

Ecuador experienced rapid population growth like most countries, but four decades of economic instability pushed millions of Ecuadorians out of the country. However, a rebound economy in the 2000s in urban centres improved the situation of living standards for Ecuadorians in a traditional class stratified economy.

According to the 2022 census, 77.5% of the population identified as "Mestizos"—a category denoting mixed Spanish and Indigenous American ancestry— reflecting an increase from 71.9% recorded in 2000 census. Conversely, the proportion of individuals identifying as "White" declined significantly, from 6.1% in 2010 to 2.2% in 2022. Amerindians account for 7.7% of the population and 4.8% of the population consists of Afro-Ecuadorians. Other estimations put the Mestizo population at 55% to 65% and the indigenous population at 25%. Genetic research indicates that the ancestry of Ecuadorian Mestizos is predominantly Indigenous.

== Population ==
Census population
Year	Pop.	±%
1950	3,202,757	—
1962	4,467,007	+39.5%
1974	6,521,710	+46.0%
1982	8,060,712	+23.6%
1990	9,648,189	+19.7%
2001	12,156,608	+26.0%
2010	14,483,499	+19.1%
2022	16,938,986	+17.0%

The Ecuadorian census is conducted by the governmental institution known as INEC, Instituto Nacional de Estadisticas y Censos (National Institute of Statistics and Census). The census in Ecuador is conducted every ten years, and its objective is to obtain the number of people residing within its borders. The current census now includes household information.

Index of growth:

Percentage of population growth (census periods)
No.	Time lapse	Growth percentile
1	1950–1962	2.96%
2	1962–1974	3.10%
3	1974–1982	2.62%
4	1982–1990	2.19%
5	1990–2001	2.05%
6	2001–2010	1.52%

=== UN estimates ===
According to the 2022 revision of the World Population Prospects the total population was 17,797,737 in 2021, compared to only 3,470,000 in 1950. The proportion of children below the age of 15 in 2015 was 29.0%, 63.4% was between 15 and 65 years of age, while 6.7% was 65 years or older.

	Total population (x 1000)	Proportion aged 0–14 (%)	Proportion aged 15–64 (%)	Proportion aged 65+ (%)
1950	3 470	39.5	55.2	5.3
1955	3 957	41.6	53.5	4.9
1960	4 546	43.3	52.0	4.7
1965	5 250	44.5	51.0	4.5
1970	6 073	44.3	51.5	4.3
1975	6 987	43.7	52.2	4.1
1980	7 976	41.8	54.1	4.1
1985	9 046	40.0	55.9	4.1
1990	10 218	38.2	57.5	4.3
1995	11 441	36.3	59.1	4.6
2000	12 629	34.7	60.3	5.0
2005	13 826	33.1	61.5	5.4
2010	15 011	31.0	63.0	6.0
2015	16 212	29.1	64.3	6.6
2020	17 643	27.4	65.0	7.6

=== Structure of the population ===
Population Estimates by Sex and Age Group (01.VII.2013) (Excludes nomadic Indian tribes. Data refer to projections based on the 2010 Population Census.):

Age group	Male	Female	Total	%
Total	7 815 935	7 958 814	15 774 749	100
0–4	864 669	826 731	1 691 400	10.72
5–9	854 691	816 503	1 671 194	10.59
10–14	815 838	783 725	1 599 563	10.14
15–19	756 376	737 082	1 493 458	9.47
20–24	685 997	682 849	1 368 846	8.68
25–29	620 881	635 987	1 256 868	7.97
30–34	559 055	593 148	1 152 203	7.30
35–39	495 340	538 054	1 033 394	6.55
40–44	437 744	476 215	913 959	5.79
45–49	387 618	419 090	806 708	5.11
50–54	336 267	360 935	697 202	4.42
55–59	279 746	298 503	578 249	3.67
60–64	223 411	238 973	462 384	2.93
65–69	172 623	187 448	360 071	2.28
70–74	128 033	142 255	270 288	1.71
75–79	89 929	101 191	191 120	1.21
80–84	57 585	64 467	122 052	0.77
85–89	31 289	34 891	66 180	0.42
90–94	13 655	15 370	29 025	0.18
95–99	4 898	5 145	10 043	0.06
100+	290	252	542	0.03
Age group	Male	Female	Total	Percent
0–14	2 535 198	2 426 959	4 962 157	31.46
15–64	4 782 435	4 980 836	9 763 271	61.89
65+	498 302	551 019	1 049 321	6.65

Population Estimates by Sex and Age Group (01.VII.2021) (Excludes nomadic Indian tribes.):

Age group	Male	Female	Total	%
Total	8 783 789	8 967 488	17 751 277	100
0–4	845 954	808 798	1 654 752	9.32
5–9	853 987	817 229	1 671 216	9.41
10–14	861 741	823 598	1 685 339	9.49
15–19	833 964	798 770	1 632 734	9.20
20–24	778 930	755 659	1 534 589	8.64
25–29	712 218	706 341	1 418 559	7.99
30–34	647 958	658 656	1 306 614	7.36
35–39	590 249	618 416	1 208 665	6.81
40–44	528 482	571 807	1 100 289	6.20
45–49	464 207	509 979	974 186	5.49
50–54	406 015	446 926	852 941	4.80
55–59	350 539	387 801	738 340	4.16
60–64	290 143	324 072	614 215	3.46
65–69	226 290	257 338	483 628	2.72
70–74	165 840	194 960	360 800	2.03
75–79	112 069	138 213	250 282	1.41
80–84	66 621	85 696	152 317	0.86
85–89	32 786	42 792	75 578	0.43
90–94	12 487	16 097	28 584	0.16
95–99	3 192	4 184	7 376	0.04
100+	117	156	273	<0.01
Age group	Male	Female	Total	Percent
0–14	2 561 682	2 449 625	5 011 307	28.23
15–64	5 602 705	5 778 427	11 381 132	64.11
65+	619 402	739 436	1 358 838	7.65

=== Geography ===
Due to the prevalence of malaria and yellow fever in the coastal region until the end of the 19th century, the Ecuadorian population was most heavily concentrated in the highlands and valleys of the "Sierra" region. In today's population approximately 50% of the population resides in the Coastal (Costa) region, while another 45% lives in the Andean Highland (Sierra) region. This means that roughly 95% of Ecuador's population is concentrated in these two regions, which together comprise only about half of the country's landmass. In contrast, the Amazonian (Oriente) region, which accounts for approximately half of Ecuador's total land area, is home to a 3–4% of the population. The smallest region, the Insular (Galapagos) region, has less than 0.2% of the total population.

The "Oriente" region, consisting of Amazonian lowlands to the east of the Andes and covering about half the country's land area, remains sparsely populated and contains only about 3% of the country's population, that for the most are indigenous peoples who maintain a wary distance from the recent Mestizo and white settlers. This is partly because of a history of violence between lowland Indigenous people and mestizo and white settlers. Although this history goes back to the colonial era, cycles of violence impacted local demographics of the Oriente as late as the early twentieth century. During the rubber boom, rubber barons enslaved native people and took them far away from Oriente towns to tap rubber. Sometimes they were also sold in Iquitos. In the early twentieth century, local observers estimated that tens of thousands of Indigenous people were taken downriver into Peru from Ecuador's Oriente.

The territories of the "Oriente" are home to as many as nine indigenous groups: Quichua, Shuar, Achuar, Waorani, Siona, Secoya, Shiwiar, and Cofan, all represented politically by the Confederation of Indigenous Nationalities of the Ecuadorian Amazon, CONFENIAE.

As a result of the oil exploration and the development of the infrastructure required for the exploitation of the oil fields in the eastern jungles during the seventies and early eighties, there was a wave of settlement in the region. The Majority of these wave of internal immigration came from the southern province of Loja as a result of a drought that lasted three years and affected the southern provinces of the country. This boom of the petroleum industry has led to a mushrooming of the town of Lago Agrio (Nueva Loja) as well as substantial deforestation and pollution of wetlands and lakes.

== Vital statistics ==
Registration of vital events is in Ecuador not complete. The Population Department of the United Nations prepared the following estimates.

Period	Live births per year	Deaths per year	Natural change per year	CBR*	CDR*	NC*	TFR*	IMR*	Life expectancy		
Period	Live births per year	Deaths per year	Natural change per year	CBR*	CDR*	NC*	TFR*	IMR*	total	males	females
1950–1955	169,000	71,000	98,000	45.6	19.2	26.4	6.75	140	48.4	47.1	49.6
1955–1960	190,000	71,000	119,000	44.8	16.7	28.1	6.75	129	51.4	50.1	52.7
1960–1965	214,000	71,000	143,000	43.6	14.5	29.1	6.65	119	54.7	53.4	56.1
1965–1970	239,000	73,000	166,000	42.2	13.0	29.2	6.40	107	56.8	55.4	58.2
1970–1975	258,000	74,000	184,000	39.6	11.4	28.2	5.80	95	58.9	57.4	60.5
1975–1980	270,000	71,000	199,000	36.2	9.5	26.7	5.05	82	61.4	59.7	63.2
1980–1985	285,000	68,000	217,000	33.5	8.0	25.5	4.45	69	64.5	62.5	66.7
1985–1990	302,000	64,000	238,000	31.4	6.7	24.7	4.00	56	67.5	65.3	69.9
1990–1995	311,000	63,000	248,000	28.7	5.8	22.9	3.55	44	70.1	67.6	72.7
1995–2000	316,000	64,000	252,000	26.3	5.4	20.9	3.20	33	72.3	69.7	75.2
2000–2005	313,000	68,000	245,000	24.2	5.1	19.1	2.94	25	74.2	71.3	77.3
2005–2010	323,000	74,000	249,000	22.1	5.0	17.1	2.69	21	75.0	72.1	78.1
2010–2015	329,000	80,000	249,000	21.0	5.1	15.9	2.56	17	76.4	73.6	79.3
2015–2020	330,000	85,000	245,000	19.9	5.1	14.8	2.44	14	77.6	74.9	80.4
2020–2025				18.5	5.2	13.3	2.32				
2025–2030				17.0	5.4	11.6	2.22				
* CBR = crude birth rate (per 1000); CDR = crude death rate (per 1000); NC = natural change (per 1000); IMR = infant mortality rate per 1000 births; TFR = total fertility rate (number of children per woman)

=== Births and deaths ===
Year	Population	Live births	Deaths	Natural increase	Crude birth rate	Crude death rate	Rate of natural increase	Crude migration rate	TFR
1932		102,802	48,149	54,653					
1933		103,199	58,094	45,105					
1934		101,225	56,021	45,204					
1935		104,477	49,193	55,284					
1936		109,581	56,372	53,209					
1937		119,324	60,176	59,148					
1938		113,348	56,155	57,193					
1939		117,726	61,134	56,592					
1940		116,888	62,139	54,749					
1941		116,506	61,802	54,704					
1942		115,991	61,922	54,069					
1943		121,832	55,810	66,022					
1944		125,568	55,073	70,495					
1945		129,101	59,606	69,495					
1946		129,331	57,411	71,920					
1947		137,226	54,574	82,652					
1948									
1949		140,842	53,487	87,335					
1950		149,153	55,986	93,167					
1951		152,999	56,857	96,142					
1953		163,809	55,132	108,677					
1954		156,719	56,615	100,104					
1955		166,977	57,226	109,751					
1956		178,520	56,390	122,130					
1957		184,919	57,885	127,034					
1958		185,932	61,650	124,282					
1959		191,991	59,740	132,251					
1960		206,178	61,054	145,124					
1961		208,455	58,166	150,289					
1962		215,980	60,082	155,898					
1963		225,099	61,129	163,970					
1964		219,137	58,989	160,148					
1965		226,436	60,202	166,234					
1966		220,930	59,618	161,312					
1967		222,508	58,317	164,191					
1968		225,717	61,697	164,020					
1990	10,149,666	310,233	50,217	260,016	30.6	4.9	25.7		
1991	10,355,598	312,007	53,333	258,674	30.1	5.2	24.9	−5.0	
1992	10,567,946	319,044	53,430	265,614	30.2	5.1	25.1	−5.0	
1993	10,786,984	333,920	52,453	281,467	31.0	4.9	26.1	−5.8	
1994	11,012,925	318,063	51,165	266,898	28.9	4.6	24.3	−3.8	
1995	11,246,107	322,856	50,867	271,989	28.7	4.5	24.2	−3.0	
1996	11,486,884	335,194	52,300	282,894	29.2	4.6	24.6	−3.2	
1997	11,735,391	326,174	52,089	274,085	27.8	4.4	23.4	−1.8	
1998	11,992,073	316,779	54,357	262,422	26.4	4.5	21.9	0	
1999	12,257,190	353,159	55,921	297,238	28.8	4.6	24.2	−2.1	
2000	12,531,210	356,065	56,420	299,645	28.4	4.5	23.9	−1.5	
2001	12,814,503	341,710	55,214	286,496	26.7	4.3	22.4	0.2	
2002	13,093,527	334,601	55,549	279,052	25.6	4.2	21.4	0.4	
2003	13,319,575	322,227	53,521	268,706	24.2	4.0	20.2	−2.9	
2004	13,551,875	312,210	54,729	257,481	23.0	4.0	19.0	−1.6	
2005	13,721,297	305,302	56,825	248,477	22.3	4.1	18.2	−5.7	
2006	13,964,606	322,030	57,940	264,090	23.1	4.1	19.0	−1.3	
2007	14,214,982	322,494	58,016	264,478	22.7	4.1	18.6	−0.7	
2008	14,472,881	325,423	60,023	265,400	22.5	4.1	18.4	−0.3	
2009	14,738,472	332,859	59,714	273,145	22.6	4.1	18.5	−0.1	
2010	15,012,228	320,997	61,681	259,316	21.4	4.1	17.3	1.3	
2011	15,266,431	329,061	62,304	266,757	21.6	4.1	17.5	−0.6	2.74
2012	15,520,973	319,127	63,511	255,616	20.6	4.1	16.5	0.2	2.68
2013	15,774,749	294,441	64,206	230,235	18.8	4.1	14.7	1.7	2.63
2014	16,027,466	291,678	63,788	227,890	18.3	4.1	14.2	1.8	2.59
2015	16,278,844	290,264	65,391	224,873	17.8	4.0	13.8	1.9	2.54
2016	16,528,730	281,814	68,304	213,510	17.0	4.1	12.9	2.5	2.50
2017	16,776,977	292,059	70,144	221,915	17.4	4.2	13.2	1.8	
2018	17,023,408	294,518	71,982	222,536	17.3	4.2	13.1	1.5	
2019	17,267,986	287,092	74,439	212,653	16.6	4.3	12.3	1.9	
2020	17,510,643	268,120	117,200	150,920	15.2	6.7	8.5	5.4	
2021	17,684,000	252,726	106,211	146,515	14.2	5.9	8.3	1.6	
2022	17,715,301	251,475	91,193	160,282	14.0	5.1	8.9	−7.1	
2023	17,834,831	240,077	89,068	151,009	13.4	5.0	8.4	−1.7	
2024	17,966,573	216,360	89,547	126,813	12.0	5.0	7.0	0.3	1.7
2025	18,163,160	208,985			11.5				

View source data.
View source data.

View source data.

=== Fertility ===
Years	1920	1921	1922	1923	1924	1925	1926	1927	1928	1929
Total Fertility Rate in Ecuador	6.89	6.93	6.96	7.01	7.05	7.09	7.13	7.17	7.15	7.13

Years	1930	1931	1932	1933	1934	1935	1936	1937	1938	1939
Total Fertility Rate in Ecuador	7.12	7.10	7.08	7.06	7.03	7.01	6.99	6.96	6.91	6.86

Years	1940	1941	1942	1943	1944	1945	1946	1947	1948	1949
Total Fertility Rate in Ecuador	6.82	6.77	6.72	6.71	6.71	6.71	6.70	6.70	6.70	6.69

== Ethnicity ==
Ethnicity in Ecuador (2022)
1. Multiracial (86.6%)
2. Amerindian (7.69%)
3. Sub-Saharan (3.36%)
4. White (2.21%)
5. Others (0.12%)

The Ecuadorian constitution recognizes the pluri-nationality of those who want to exercise their affiliation with their native ethnic groups. There are five major ethnic groups in Ecuador: Mestizo, European, Afroecuadorian, Amerindian, and Montubio. Mestizos constitute more than 85% of the population.

Ecuador's population descends from Spanish immigrants and South American Amerindians, admixed with descendants of black slaves who arrived to work on coastal plantations in the sixteenth century. The mix of these groups is described as Mestizo.

A geography of ethnicity remained well-defined until the surge in migration that began in the 1950s. Whites resided primarily in larger cities. Mestizos lived in small towns scattered throughout the countryside. Indians formed the bulk of the Sierra rural populace, although Mestizos filled this role in the areas with few Indians. Most blacks lived in Esmeraldas Province, with small enclaves found in the Carchi and Imbabura provinces. Pressure on Sierra land resources and the dissolution of the traditional hacienda, however, increased the numbers of Indians migrating to the Costa, the Oriente, and the cities.

=== Mestizos ===
Ecuador's population is predominantly mestizo, accounting for approximately 86% of the total. This group, however, is broadly categorized and includes several distinct regional subgroups that live both on the Andes and the Coast, where the bulk of the Ecuadorian population is concentrated.

==== Montubios ====
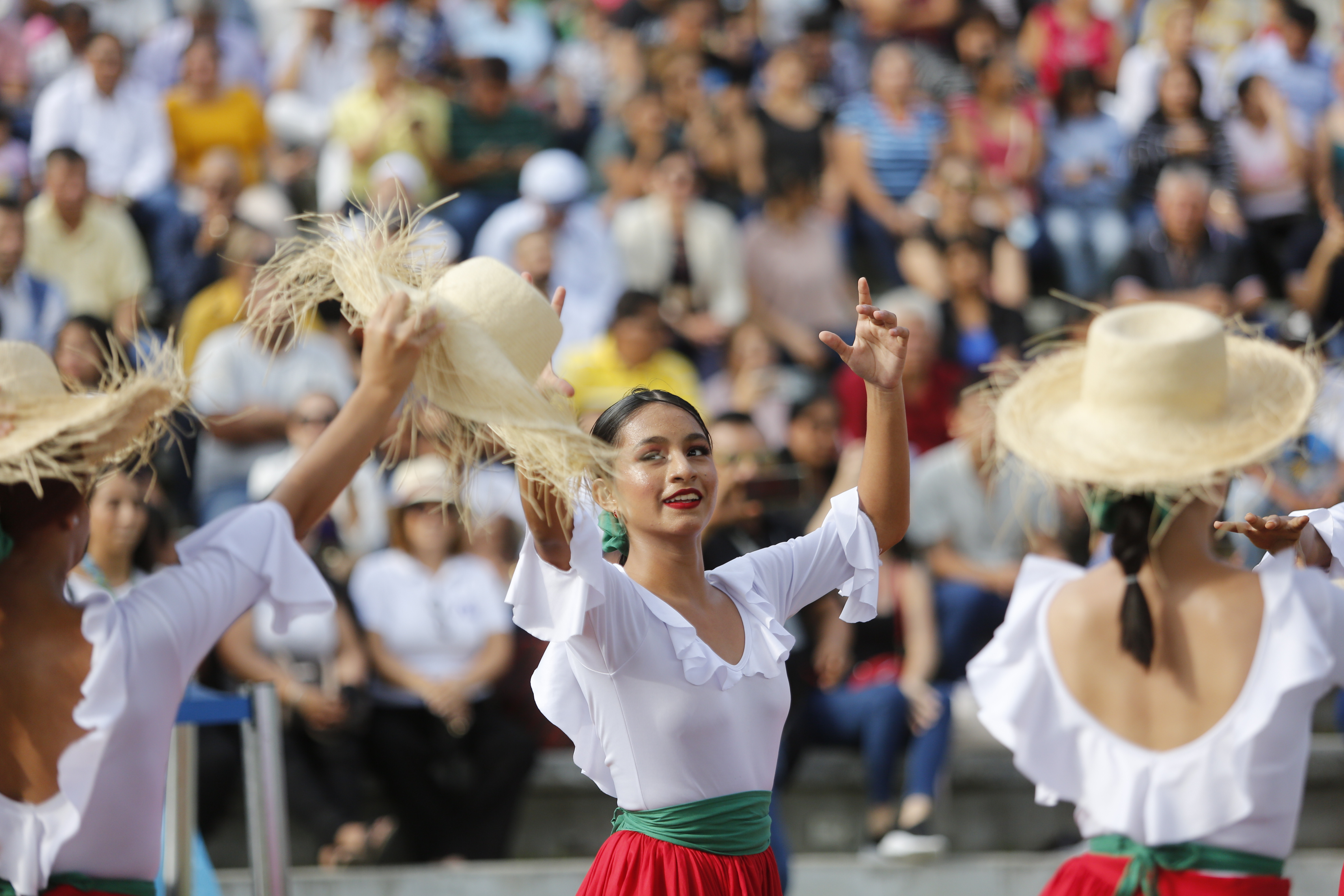
Montuvias dancing traditional amorfinos with ecuadorian hats

Also written Montuvio is the term used for the coastal farmers of Ecuador. Some believe the name originates from their horsemanship, positioning them as the archetypal cowboys of Ecuador's Pacific coast—similar to the chagra who is the cowboy of the Ecuadorian Andes, or the llaneros of Colombia and Venezuela. Their attire typically includes a wide-brimmed hat, a light shirt, cloth trousers, boots, a machete, a hook, and a horse for transportation. According to the 2022 Ecuadorian census, Montuvios constitute 7.7% of Ecuador's population, meaning over 1,304,994 Ecuadorians identified as Montuvios in that year. The census also revealed that the majority of Montuvios reside in the provinces of Guayas, Manabí, and Los Ríos.

==== Cholos ====
Cholo fishermen are a Mestizo group inhabiting the coasts of Guayas, Santa Elena, and Manabí. They represent a blend of indigenous-Mestizo and indigenous-Afro heritage, with a greater indigenous contribution than the Montuvios. The distinction between Cholos, Mestizos, and Montuvios is often blurred, and economic activity is frequently used as a differentiator. Thus, coastal Cholos are primarily associated with fishing, generally artisanal. With the economic development of this region, fishing industrialized around the city of Manta, leading many Cholos to migrate there to continue their economic activity. They are also involved in shrimp farming, another industrialization of this profession, which is currently one of Ecuador's main export products. Despite their significant presence in the coastal population of these three provinces, there are no exact statistics on their numbers.

Conversely, in southern Ecuador, the word "Cholo" refers to the farmers of Azuay, specifically the chola cuencana. This figure is characterized by a traditional costume that evolved in the 18th century and has adapted to the present day. This term is analogous to the chazos of Loja and the chagras of Quito, both referring to the farmers of the Ecuadorian highlands. Beyond her traditional attire, the chola cuencana is known for her dedication to agriculture and participation in the "Pase del Niño," a traditional parade in the city of Loja.

==== Chazos ====
Chazos are the traditional farmers of southern Ecuador, concentrated in the province of Loja. They are an integral part of the country's folklore and have a traditional costume similar to the farmers of Colombia's coffee region. This similarity stems from their shared economic activity, as agriculture, particularly coffee cultivation, has flourished in this region. Consequently, the Chazo is often depicted with a coffee harvesting bag. Like the Cholos, there are no exact statistics on their numbers, yet they represent a significant portion of southern Ecuador's population. Currently, Chazos, along with Cholos and Chagras, are not formally represented in the census. The only traditional peasant group in Ecuador that has achieved this recognition are the Montuvios of the coast, who, due to their substantial numbers concentrated around the Gulf of Guayaquil and the Guayas River basin, have gained official visibility.

==== Chagras ====
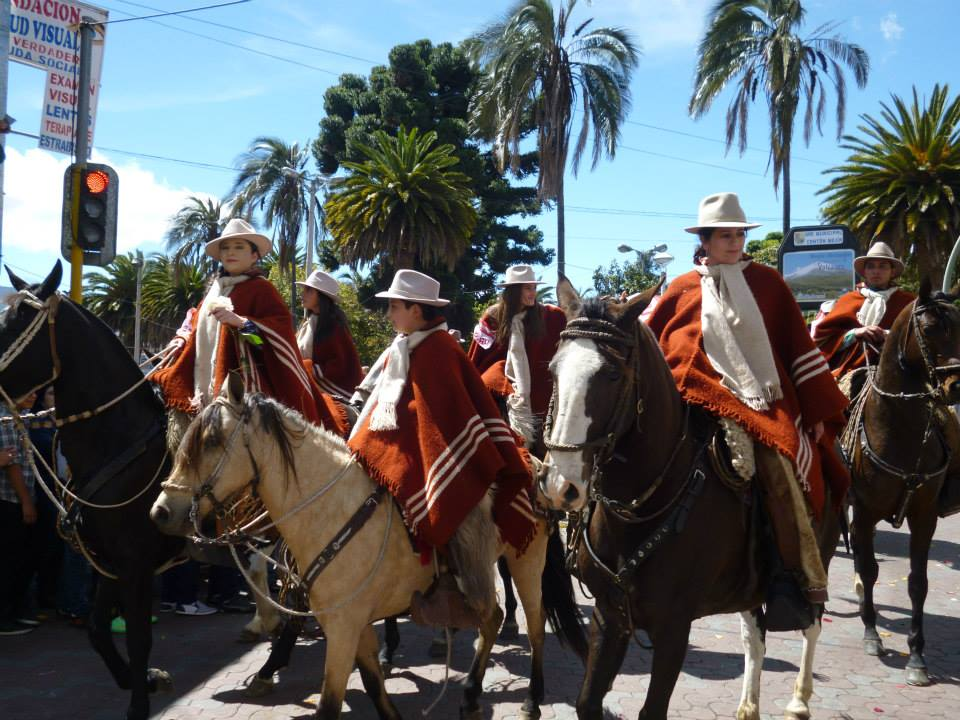
Chagra Processional Parade in Machachi

In Ecuador, Chagras are the farmers of the Ecuadorian Andes known for their cattle ranching activities, considered muleteers or drovers. They are the primary cowboys of the Ecuadorian highlands and should not be confused with the Montuvios, who are the main group of coastal farmers whose economic activity also involves cattle ranching. Their current attire includes a shirt, poncho, felt hat, sheep's wool scarf, and zamarro (leather chaps). Their history revolves around haciendas, as both religious orders and landowners owned large productive properties where this tradition developed from the 17th century. This fostered the culture surrounding the Chagra, who is responsible for caring for the livestock. They are typically Mestizos, either hired by landowners or themselves small to medium-sized proprietors of land and cattle. Currently, events like the "Paseo del Chagra de Machachi" in July, the "Fiestas Parroquiales de Conocoto" in June, and the "Fiestas del Maíz y del Turismo de Sangolquí" in September celebrate this culture.

==== Pupos ====
Pupo is the name given to the farmers of northern Ecuador, especially in the province of Carchi. The word "Pupo" is etymologically derived from the Chaima language, meaning "head." Its use began as a metaphor, implying that the people of Carchi are the "heads" of these regions or even the "head" of the national territory. It is closely linked to Colombian history following the conservative revolution, when some Colombian generals invaded Ecuador. However, an Ecuadorian leader named Rafael Arellano organized liberal troops and thwarted the invasion, defeating the Colombian conservatives. In retaliation, Mercedes Landázuri, a conservative leader, insulted the Ecuadorian troops by calling them "pupos" because the soldiers' uniforms were too small, exposing their navels. This word was reappropriated and is now used to commemorate this triumph and defense of Ecuadorian sovereignty.

=== Other ethnicities ===
==== Afro-Ecuadorian ====
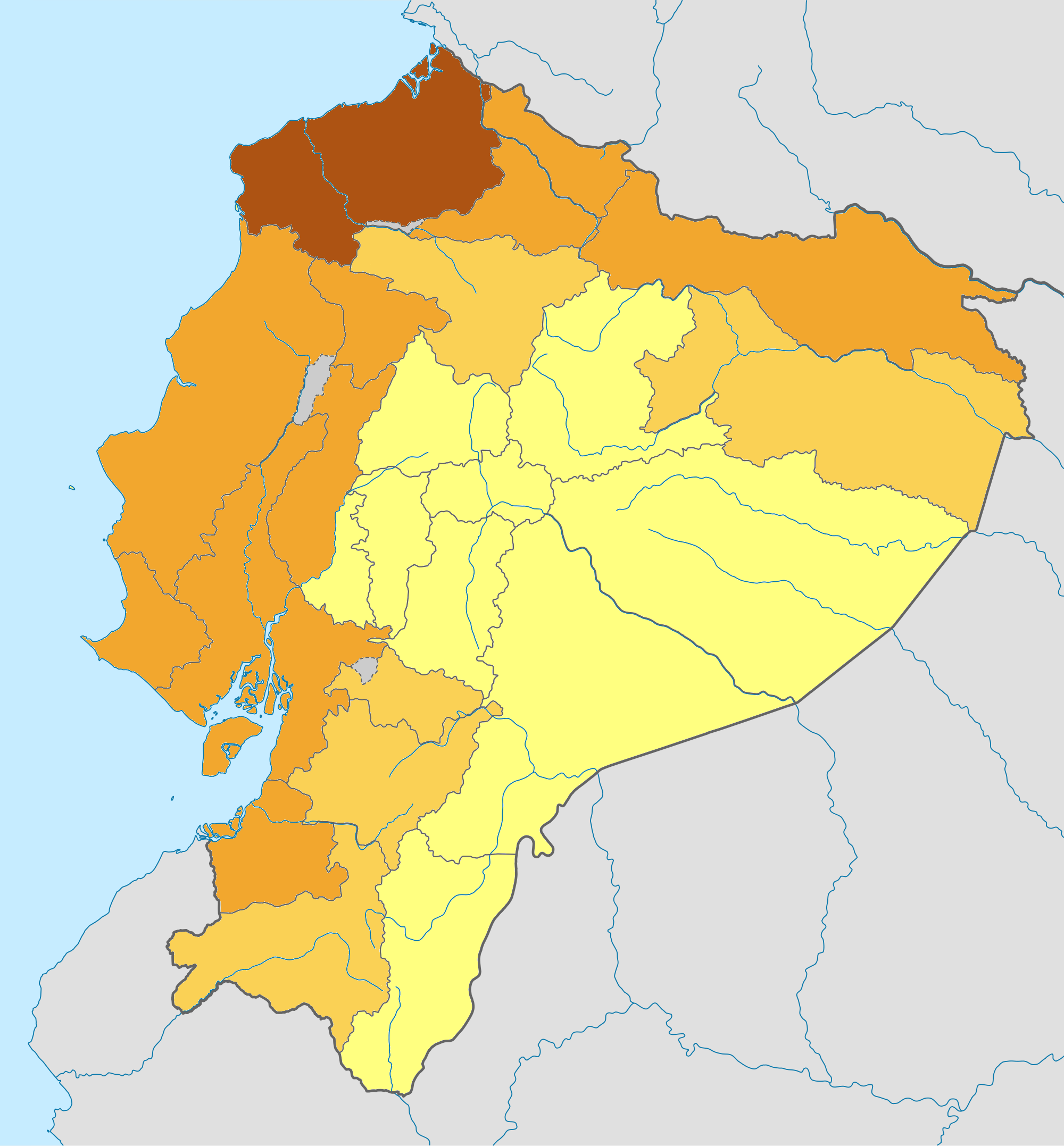
Brown: 10–99%, Orange: 5–10%, Light orange: 2–5%, Yellow: 0–2%

Afro-Ecuadorians are an ethnic group in Ecuador who are descendants of black African slaves brought by the Spanish during their conquest of Ecuador. They make up from 3% to 5% of Ecuador's population.

A large part of their population has historically been distributed in the province of Esmeraldas and the Chota Valley; more recently, there is a significant population across all provinces of the country. They originally settled in Esmeraldas, Imbabura, Carchi; subsequently, in the 1960s, due to immigration, their population inhabits the provinces of Guayas, Pichincha, El Oro, Los Ríos, Manabí, and the Ecuadorian East. Afro-Ecuadorians settled in the Chota Valley and the basin of the Mira River, geographically in the provinces of Imbabura and Carchi, whose settlement is linked to colonial haciendas that concentrated enslaved population. A large part of Ecuadorian Black people descend from survivors of slave ships that ran aground on the northern coast of Ecuador and the southern coast of Colombia between the 17th and 18th centuries. These individuals organized their own communities outside the influence of indigenous peoples and Spanish colonizers, being self-liberated. They settled in the Esmeraldas area and its surroundings and have subsequently experienced a process of migration to other areas. Another percentage comes from slaves who arrived in the 18th century from haciendas in Colombia, the coast, and the highlands, who gained their freedom after the 1860s. Both groups, the freed people of Esmeraldas and the slaves in the rest of the country, typically came from the peoples of West Africa, and have Spanish surnames derived from their former masters or genuinely African but Hispanized surnames. Later arrivals of Black people to Ecuador occurred in the late 19th and early 20th centuries, during the construction of the Durán-Quito railway under the government of Eloy Alfaro, who massively contracted them as construction workers from Jamaica, causing a small immigration. Many of them stayed in the country and formed families. Chronologically, they were the first people organized under the ideologies of the working-class labor movement in Ecuador, especially anarchism. However, they did not engage in proselytizing work outside of the Jamaican migrant workers due to language, cultural, and racial differences with Ecuadorians. They are characterized by their Anglo-Saxon surnames and are currently completely assimilated into the cities.

Ecuador has a population of about 1,120,000 descendants from African people. The Afro-Ecuadorian culture is found primarily in the country's northwest coastal region. Africans form a majority (70%) in the province of Esmeraldas and also have an important concentration in the Valle del Chota in the Imbabura Province. They can be also found in important numbers in Quito and Guayaquil.

==== White ====
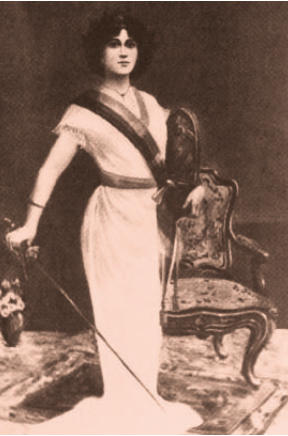
Manuela Sáenz, hero of Ecuadorian independence

According to the 2022 national census 2.21% of the population or 374.925 people self-identified as white, a 3.9% decrease over the 2010 census. According to data from the Francisco Lizcano, the white population in the 1990s was between 10% and 15%, while at the beginning of the 2000s it was around 10%, and in the 2010s it dropped to 6.1%.

This change in recent years is due to the reduction of racism in Ecuador and the population's acceptance of their mixed-race origins, with more light-skinned hispanics identifying as mestizo rather than white. Another cause was the migratory exodus that the country experienced between 1999 and 2004 during the banking crisis, which led to many white Ecuadorians leaving the country.

==== Indigenous ====
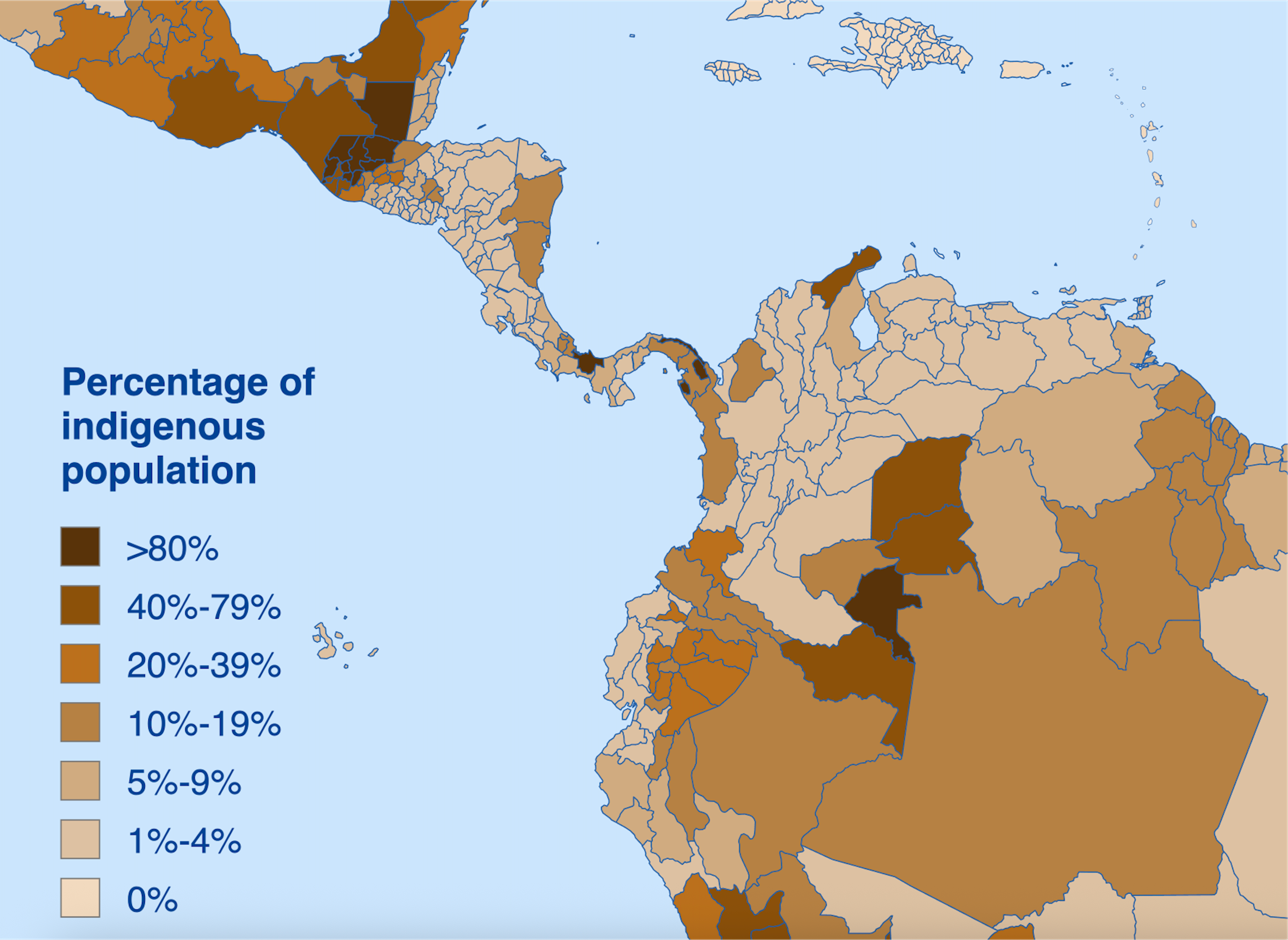
Percentage of indigenous population in the region

The Sierra Indigenous had an estimated population of 1.5 to 2 million in the early 1980s and live in the intermontane valleys of the Andes. Prolonged contact with Hispanic culture, which dates back to the conquest, has had a homogenizing effect, reducing the variation among the indigenous Sierra tribes.

The Indigenous people of the Sierra are separated from whites and Mestizos by a caste-like gulf. They are marked as a disadvantaged group; to be an Indigenous person in Ecuador is to be stigmatized. Poverty rates are higher and literacy rates are lower among Indigenous than the general population. They enjoy limited participation in national institutions and are often excluded from social and economic opportunities available to more privileged groups. However, some groups of Indigenous, such as the Otavalo people, have increased their socioeconomic status to extent that they enjoy a higher standard of living than many other Indigenous groups in Ecuador and many Mestizos of their area.

Visible markers of ethnic affiliation, especially hairstyle, dress, and language, separate Indigenous from the rest of the populace. Indigenous wore more manufactured items by the late 1970s than previously; their clothing, nonetheless, was distinct from that of other rural inhabitants. Indigenous in communities relying extensively on wage labor sometimes assumed Western-style dress while still maintaining their Indigenous identity. Indigenous speak Spanish and, Quichua—a Quechua dialect—although most are bilingual, speaking Spanish as a second language with varying degrees of facility. By the late 1980s, some younger Indigenous no longer learned Quichua.

On the other hand, the oriente indigenous people first came into contact with Europeans in the 16th century, the encounters were more sporadic than those of most of the country's indigenous population. Until the 19th century, most non-Amerindians entering the region were either traders or missionaries. Beginning in the 1950s, however, the government built roads and encouraged settlers from the Sierra to colonize the Amazon River Basin. Virtually all remaining Indians were brought into increasing contact with national society. The interaction between Indians and outsiders had a profound impact on the indigenous way of life.

In the late 1970s, roughly 30,000 Quichua speakers and 15,000 Jívaros lived in Oriente Indigenous communities. Quichua speakers (sometimes referred to as the Yumbos) grew out of the detribalization of members of many different groups after the Spanish conquest. Subject to the influence of Quichua-speaking missionaries and traders, various elements of the Yumbos adopted the tongue as a lingua franca and gradually lost their previous languages and tribal origins. Yumbos were scattered throughout the Oriente, whereas the Jívaros—subdivided into the Shuar and the Achuar—were concentrated in southeastern Ecuador. Some also lived in northeastern Peru. Traditionally, both groups relied on migration to resolve intracommunity conflict and to limit the ecological damage to the tropical forest caused by slash-and-burn agriculture.

Both the Yumbos and the Jívaros depended on agriculture as their primary means of subsistence. Manioc, the main staple, was grown in conjunction with a wide variety of other fruits and vegetables. Yumbo men also resorted to wage labor to obtain cash for the few purchases deemed necessary. By the mid-1970s, increasing numbers of Quichua speakers settled around some of the towns and missions of the Oriente. Indians themselves had begun to make a distinction between Christian and jungle Indians. The former engaged in trade with townspeople. The Jívaros, in contrast to the Christian Quichua speakers, lived in more remote areas. Their mode of horticulture was similar to that of the non-Christian Yumbos, although they supplemented crop production with hunting and some livestock raising.

Shamans (curanderos) played a pivotal role in social relations in both groups. As the main leaders and the focus of local conflicts, shamans were believed to both cure and kill through magical means. In the 1980s group conflicts between rival shamans still erupted into full-scale feuds with loss of life.

The Oriente Indigenous population dropped precipitously during the initial period of intensive contact with outsiders. The destruction of their crops by Mestizos laying claim to indigenous lands, the rapid exposure to diseases to which Indians lacked immunity, and the extreme social disorganization all contributed to increased mortality and decreased birth rates. One study of the Shuar in the 1950s found that the group between ten and nineteen years of age was smaller than expected. This was the group that had been youngest and most vulnerable during the initial contact with national society. Normal population growth rates began to reestablish themselves after approximately the first decade of such contact.

== Ancestry ==
Over the past few years, several studies have been conducted on the genetic composition of Ecuadorians. These studies have helped determine the genetic origin of mestizaje (mixed-ancestry) in Ecuador. Various international universities and independent research teams, such as Cornell University and the University of Brasilia, have carried out these studies, with their findings published in scientific journals like DNA Tribes, Science Direct, PLoS Genetics, Research Gate, American Journal of Biology, and Nature, among others. Based on an average of the recent studies since 2008, the genetic composition of Ecuadorians is approximately:

- 53.8% Amerindian ancestry
- 38.3% European ancestry
- 7.4% African ancestry

The studies based on Y-STRs and mitochondrial DNA (mtDNA) offer complementary views into Ecuadorian ancestry due to their distinct inheritance patterns: Y-STRs, found on the Y-chromosome, are passed exclusively from father to son, making them ideal for tracing the direct paternal line. Conversely, mtDNA, located in cellular mitochondria, is inherited solely from mother to all her children, allowing for the direct tracing of the maternal line. To better understand the mestizaje in Ecuador, a study analyzing Y-STRs in 415 Ecuadorian men across the Amazon, Andes, and Pacific coast revealed that the majority of ancestry is European is located in the coast and the south of Ecuador. The concentration of Amerindian ancestry was located in the northern andes and the Amazon Region, while the African component concentrated in the northwest part of the country. The list of the most relevant studies is the following:

Amerindian	European	African	Arab	Asian	Study	Year	Source
64,6 %	31,0 %	4,4 %	—	—	O impacto das migrações na constituição genética de populações Latino-americanas	2008	Universidad de Brasilia
53,9 %	38,8 %	7,3 %	—	—	Genome-wide patterns of population structure and admixture among Hispanic/Latino populations	2009	Universidad de Cornell
49,1 %	36,8 %	6,1 %	4,7 %	—	DNA Tribes SNP Admixture Results by Population	2012	DNA Tribes
56,0 %	39,5 %	4,5 %	—	—	Admixture and genetic relationships of Mexican Mestizos regarding Latin American and Caribbean populations based on 13 CODIS-STRs	2015	Homo: Journal of Comparative Human Biology
50,1 %	40,8 %	6,8 %	—	2,3 %	Genomic Insights into the Ancestry and Demographic History of South America	2015	PLoS Genetics
52,0 %	42,0 %	6,0 %	—	—	Admixture in the Américas: Regional and National Differences	2016	Research Gate
47,1 %	38,3 %	14,6 %	—	—	A Study of the Molecular Variants Associated with Lactase Persistencein Different Ecuadorian Ethnic Group	2016	American Journal of Biology
59,6 %	28,8 %	11,6 %	—	—	The three-hybrid genetic composition of an Ecuadorian population using AIMs-InDels compared with autosomes, mitochondrial DNA and Y chromosome data	2019	Nature

== Culture ==
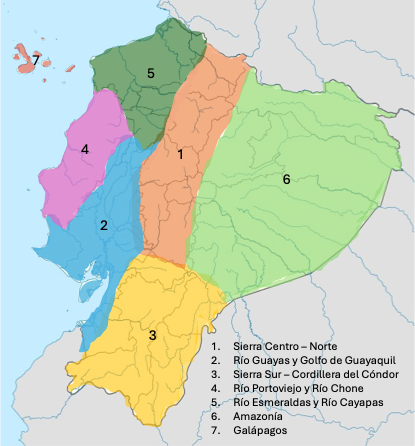
The main cultural regions of Ecuador

Ecuador's diverse cultural landscape is shaped by its varied geography and rich history. The Sierra Centro-Norte (Region 1), with its volcanic terrain, was a crucial center for early indigenous settlements and later became known for its hacienda culture and the renowned Quito School of art. This region also played a significant role in scientific advancements, such as the French Geodesic Mission, which ultimately lent its name to the country.

Meanwhile, the coastal Río Guayas and Golfo de Guayaquil (Region 2), with its extensive river network, fostered a distinct "montuvia" and "porteña" culture, deeply connected to agriculture and maritime activities. This area developed a unique abstract art style and is celebrated for its influential literary "Grupo de Guayaquil" and its contributions to the national "pasillo" music.

Further south, the Sierra Sur and Cordillera del Cóndor (Region 3), historically more isolated, witnessed a faster process of mestizaje and an economy focused on quinine trade. It's also recognized for early musical forms like the "Tono del niño" and its significant literary output of the cities of Loja and Cuenca. This region historically was characterized by the "communities of mute individuals" a term coined by Dr. Haim Avni, which are believed to have been founded in the Loja province of Ecuador. This communities were conformed by Jewish refugees fleeing the Inquisition during the colonial era. These groups, settling along the Chira and Catamayo rivers, formed small, insular, and often endogamous communities. Their clandestine nature extended to activities like mining in Zaruma, where they resisted official inquiries.

Moving to the northern coast, Río Portoviejo and Río Chone (Region 4), primarily Manabí province, boasts a strong montuvio identity. Despite its historical isolation, it thrives on fishing and agriculture. The pre-Columbian Manteño culture, known for its maritime skills, laid the foundation for Manabí's rich gastronomy, which is now recognized as Intangible Cultural Heritage. The region's vibrant cultural expressions include the chigualo celebration and the traditional "amorfinos."

Adjacent to this, the Río Esmeraldas and Río Cayapas (Region 5), often called the "green province," is a vital part of the Chocó biogeographic area. This region is the heart of Afro-Ecuadorian culture, shaped by the descendants of cimarrones. Their heritage is vividly expressed through rich mythology, the distinctive marimba esmeraldeña music (a UNESCO Intangible Cultural Heritage), and a syncretic literary tradition. The discovery of oil in the Amazon, leading to a refinery in Esmeraldas, profoundly transformed the national economy and spurred development in this coastal area.

Ecuador's Amazonía (Region 6), a sprawling plain around the Napo and Pastaza river basins, holds immense cultural and political significance, especially in debates surrounding resource exploitation and historical territorial claims. It's home to indigenous communities like the Waorani, Kichwa, and Shuar, whose languages are vital to intercultural relations. Scientific exploration, notably by Manuel Villavicencio, has been crucial in mapping and understanding this biodiverse region. The discovery of oil here in the late 1960s dramatically altered Ecuador's economic landscape, turning it into a major oil exporter.

Off the coast, the Galápagos Islands (Region 7) are an ecological wonder, designated a UNESCO World Heritage site and the planet's second-largest marine reserve. Known for its unique biodiversity and active volcanic landscape, the islands are a major tourist destination and have inspired numerous literary works.

== Language ==
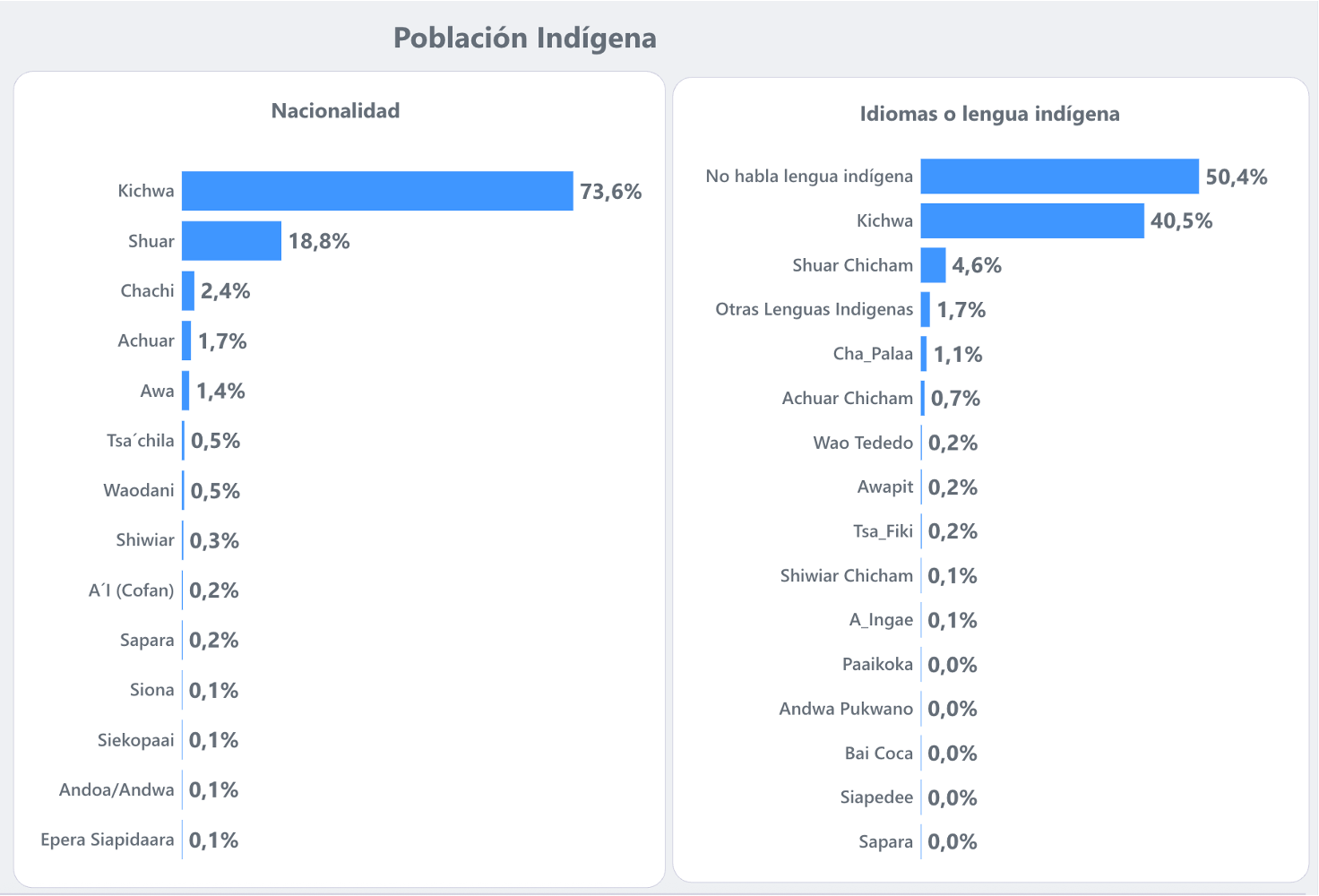
Distribution of indigenous "nationalities" and proportion of the indigenous population (circa 1'302.057 people or 7.7% of the total) that speaks an indigenous language.

Most Ecuadorians speak Spanish. According to the last Census of 2022, of the 7.7% of the population that identifies as indigenous, 3.2% speak an indigenous language. That means that from a total indigenous population of 1'302.057 people, 50,4% of them do not speak an indigenous language. In absolute numbers, that 3.2% of the population amounts to 645.821 people that speak an indigenous language. The distribution is the following:

- Kichwa with 527,333 speakers, making up 40.5% of the total indigenous population.
- Shuar with 59,894 speakers, making up 4.6% of the total indigenous population.
- Other languages with 58,594 speakers, making up 4.5% of the total indigenous population.

The other amerindian languages spoken in Ecuador include Awapit (spoken by the Awá), A'ingae (spoken by the Cofan), Achuar Chicham (spoken by the Achuar), Shiwiar (spoken by the Shiwiar), Cha'palaachi (spoken by the Chachi), Tsa'fiki (spoken by the Tsáchila), Paicoca (spoken by the Siona and Secoya), and Wao Tededeo (spoken by the Waorani). Though most features of Ecuadorian Spanish are those universal to the Spanish-speaking world, there are several idiosyncrasies.

== Religion ==
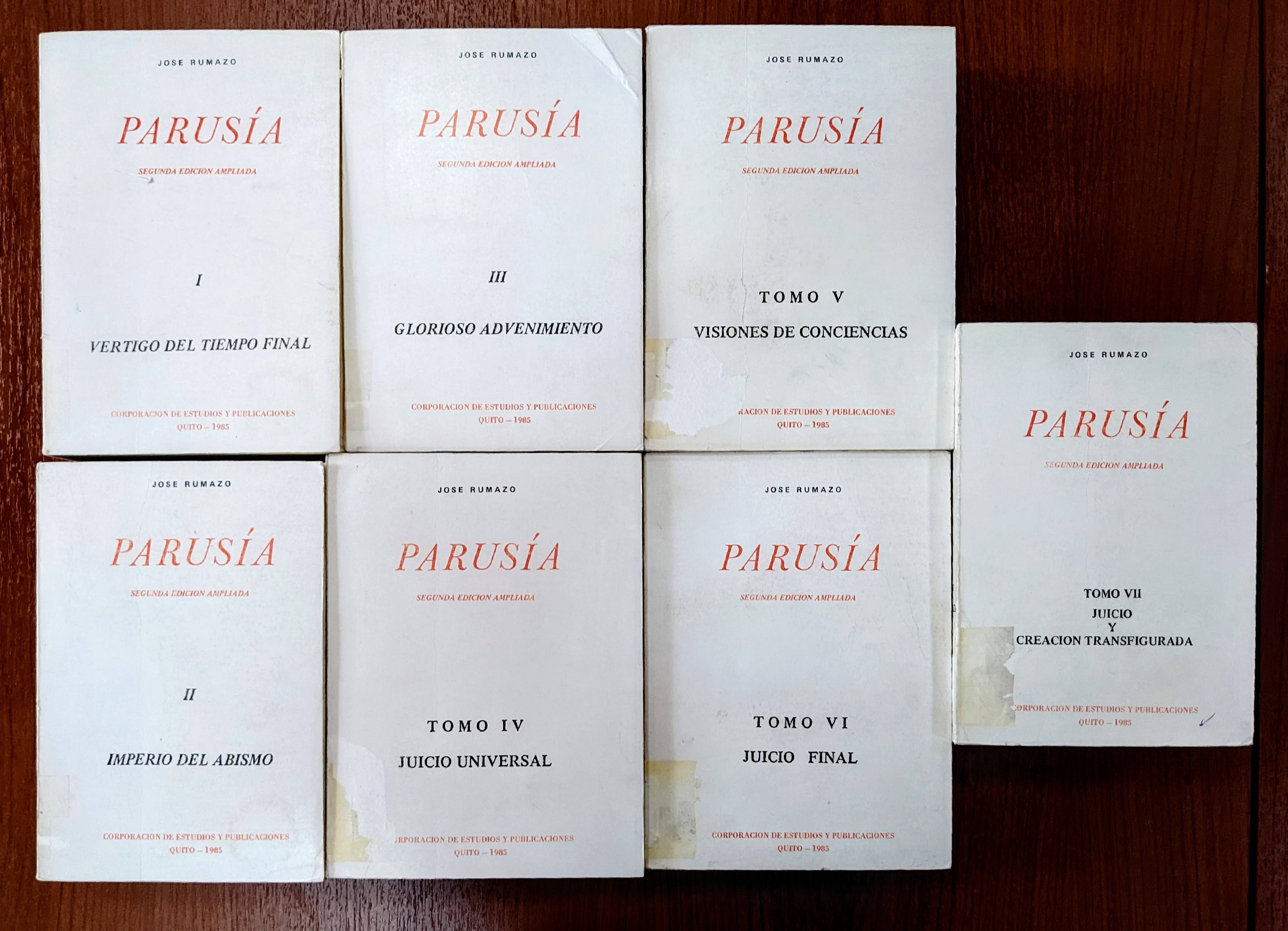
Religious epic poem Parusía, written by José Rumazo

According to the Ecuadorian National Institute of Statistics and Census, 91.95% of the country's population have a religion, 7.94% are atheists and 0.11% are agnostics. Among those with a religion, 80.44% are Roman Catholic, 11.30% are Protestants, and 8.26% other (mainly Jewish, Buddhists and Latter-day Saints).

In the rural parts of Ecuador, indigenous beliefs and Catholicism are sometimes syncretized. Most festivals and annual parades are based on religious celebrations, many incorporating a mixture of rites and icons.

There is a small number of Eastern Orthodox Christians, indigenous religions, Muslims (see Islam in Ecuador), Buddhists and Baháʼís. There are about 185,000 members of the Church of Jesus Christ of Latter-day Saints (LDS Church), and over 80,000 Jehovah's Witnesses in the country.

The "Jewish Community of Ecuador" (Comunidad Judía del Ecuador) has its seat in Quito and has approximately 300 members. Nevertheless, this number is declining because young people leave the country towards the United States of America or Israel. The Community has a Jewish Center with a synagogue, a country club and a cemetery. It supports the "Albert Einstein School", where Jewish history, religion and Hebrew classes are offered. Since 2004, there has also been a Chabad house in Quito.

There are very small communities in Cuenca and Ambato. The "Comunidad de Culto Israelita" reunites the Jews of Guayaquil. This community works independently from the "Jewish Community of Ecuador". Jewish visitors to Ecuador can also take advantage of Jewish resources as they travel and keep kosher there, even in the Amazon rainforest. The city has also synagogue of Messianic Judaism.

== Migration trends ==
In recent decades, there has been a high rate of emigration due to the economic crisis that seriously affected the economy of the country in the 1990s, over 400,000 Ecuadorians left for Spain and Italy, and around 100,000 for the United Kingdom while several hundred thousand Ecuadorians live in the US, (500,000 by some estimates) mostly in the cities of the Northeastern corridor. Many other Ecuadorians have emigrated across Latin America, thousands have gone to Japan and Australia. One famous American of Ecuadorian descent is pop music vocalist Christina Aguilera.

In Ecuador there are about 100,000 Americans and over 30,000 European Union expatriates. They move to Ecuador for business opportunities and as cheaper place for retirement.

As a result of the political conflict in Colombia and of the criminal gangs that had appeared in the areas of power vacuum a constant flow of refugees and asylum seekers as well as economic migrants of Colombian origin had moved into Ecuadorian territory. Over the last decade at least 45,000 displaced people are now residents in Ecuador, the Ecuadorian government and international organizations are assisting them. According to the UNHCR 2009 report as many as 167,189 refugees and asylum seekers are temporary residents in Ecuador.

Following the migratory trend to Europe many of the jobs that those that left held in the country had been taken over by Peruvian economic migrants. Those jobs are mostly in agriculture and unskilled labor. There are no official statistics but some press reports estimate their number into the tens of thousands.

There is a diverse community of Middle Eastern Ecuadorians, numbering in the tens of thousands, mostly from Lebanese, Syrian and Palestinian descent; prominent in commerce and industry, and concentrated in the coastal cities of Guayaquil, Quevedo and Machala. They are well assimilated into the local culture and are referred commonly as "turcos" since the early migrants of these communities arrived with passports issued by the Ottoman Empire in the beginning of the century.

Ecuador is also home to communities of Spaniards, Italians, Germans, Portuguese, French, Britons and Greek-Ecuadorians. Ecuadorian Jews, who number around 300 are mostly of German or Italian descent. There are 225,000 English speakers and 112,000 German speakers in Ecuador of which the great majority reside in Quito, mainly all descendants of immigrants who arrived in the late 19th century and of retired emigrees that returned to their terroir. Most of the descendants of European immigrants strive for the preservation of their heritage. Therefore, some groups even have their own schools (e.g. German School Guayaquil and German School Quito), Liceé La Condamine (French Heritage), Alberto Einstein (Jewish Heritage) and The British School of Quito (Anglo-British), cultural and social organizations, churches and country clubs. Their contribution for the social, political and economical development of the country is immense, specially in relation to their percentage in the total population. Most of the families of European heritage belong to the Ecuadorian upper class and had married into the wealthiest families of the country.

There is also a small Asian-Ecuadorian (see Asian Latino) community estimated in a range from 2,500 to 25,000, mainly consists of those having any amount of Chinese Han descent, and possibly 10,000 being Japanese whose ancestors arrived as miners, farm hands and fishermen in the late 19th century. Guayaquil has an East Asian community, mostly Chinese including Taiwanese, and Japanese, as well as a Southeast Asian community, mostly Filipinos.

== LGBT+ population ==
In the 2022 census, the National Institute of Statistics and Census included questions about the LGBT+ population for the first time. Said census showed that 2.4% of the adult population of Ecuador was lesbian, gay, bisexual, transgender or other queer identity.

== See also ==
- Ecuadorian census
- Indigenous peoples in Ecuador
- Afro Ecuadorian
- Lebanese people in Ecuador
- Culture of Ecuador
- Social class in Ecuador
- Ecuadorian Americans
- Hispanics
- Music of Ecuador
