= NiuTrans =

Chinese machine translation system

- Developer: Natural Language Processing Laboratory of Northeastern University
- Written in: C++
- Operating system: windows/linux
- Available in: 450 languages and language varieties
- Type: Machine translation
- License: Apache-2.0 License
- Website: niutrans.com (Platform) github.com/NiuTrans (NiuTrans Open Source)

NiuTrans is a machine translation system. It has a platform, an API, and two open-source translation systems. It is developed by the Natural Language Processing Group at Northeastern University (China).

== Translation systems ==
NiuTrans.SMT is an open-source statistical machine translation system jointly developed by the Natural Language Processing Laboratory of Northeastern University and Shenyang Yayi Network Technology Co., Ltd.

NiuTrans.NMT is a lightweight and efficient Transformer-based neural machine translation system. It is implemented with pure C++ and it is heavily optimized for fast decoding. The system can run with various systems and devices.

== Supported languages ==
As of October 2026, translation is available in 450 languages:

1. Abkhaz
2. Acateco
3. Aceh
4. Achi
5. Acholi
6. Achuar
7. Adhola
8. Afar
9. Afrikaans
10. Agni Sanvi
11. Aguaruna
12. Akawaio
13. Albanian
14. Algerian Arabic
15. Alur
16. Ambai
17. Amharic
18. Amuzgo
19. Antipolo Ifugao
20. Arabic
21. Aragonese
22. Armenian
23. Ashéninka
24. Asturian
25. Ayacucho Quechua
26. Ayangan Ifugao
27. Aymara
28. Azerbaijani
29. Baka
30. Bambam
31. Bambara
32. Bandial
33. Bantoanon
34. Baoulé
35. Barasana
36. Bari
37. Bariai
38. Bariba
39. Basaa
40. Bashkir
41. Basque
42. Batak Karo
43. Batak Simalungun
44. Belarusian
45. Belizean Creole
46. Bemba
47. Bengali
48. Berber
49. Biak
50. Bislama
51. Bokmål
52. Bokobaru
53. Bola
54. Bosnian
55. Brazilian Portuguese
56. Brezhoneg
57. Bualkhaw Chin
58. Bulgarian
59. Bulu
60. Burmese
61. Busa
62. Cabecar
63. Cakchiquel
64. Cameroonian Pidgin
65. Campa
66. Camsa
67. Canadian French
68. Cañar Highland Quichua
69. Cantonese
70. Cape Verdean Creole
71. Catalan
72. Cebuano
73. Central Bikol
74. Central Dusun
75. Central Huasteca Nahuatl
76. Central Ifugao
77. Central Puebla Nahuatl
78. Chakma
79. Chamorro
80. Chechen
81. Cherokee
82. Chewa
83. Chhattisgarhi
84. Chimborazo Highland Quichua
85. Chinantec
86. Chinese (Simplified)
87. Chinese (Traditional)
88. Chiru
89. Chokwe
90. Chopi
91. Chuukese
92. Chuvash
93. Chuwabu
94. Congo Swahili
95. Cook Islands Māori
96. Coptic
97. Cornish
98. Corsican
99. Crimean Tatar
100. Croatian
101. Cusco Quechua
102. Czech
103. Dadibi
104. Dangme
105. Danish
106. Dinka
107. Ditammari
108. Divehi
109. Drehu
110. Duala
111. Dutch
112. Dyula
113. Dzongkha
114. Eastern Cagayan Agta
115. Edo
116. Efik
117. English
118. Enxet
119. Esan
120. Esperanto
121. Estonian
122. Ewe
123. Falam Chin
124. Faroese
125. Fijian
126. Filipino
127. Finnish
128. Fon
129. Frafra
130. Franco-Provençal
131. French
132. Frisian
133. Friulian
134. Ga
135. Galela
136. Galician
137. Garifuna
138. Gbaya
139. Georgian
140. German
141. Goffa
142. Greek
143. Guajajára
144. Guarani
145. Guaymí
146. Gujarati
147. Gun
148. Haitian Creole
149. Hakha Chin
150. Halbi
151. Hausa
152. Hawaiian
153. Hawaiian Creole English
154. Hebrew
155. Herero
156. Hiligaynon
157. Hill Mari
158. Hindi
159. Hiri Motu
160. Hmong
161. Huautla Mazatec
162. Huli
163. Hungarian
164. Hupa
165. Iban
166. Ibanag
167. Icelandic
168. Ido
169. Igbo
170. Ika
171. Ilocano
172. Imbabura Highland Quichua
173. Indonesian
174. Interlingua
175. Interlingue
176. Irish
177. Isoko
178. Isthmus Zapotec
179. Italian
180. Izi
181. Jakalteko
182. Japanese
183. Javanese
184. Jingpho
185. Kabiye
186. Kabyle
187. Kakwa
188. Kalaallisut
189. Kalmyk-Oirat
190. Kamba
191. Kannada
192. Kanuri
193. Kaonde
194. Kapingamarangi
195. Kaqchikel
196. Kasem
197. Kashubian
198. Kaulong
199. Kazakh (Arabic)
200. Kazakh (Cyrillic)
201. Keliko
202. Khmer
203. Kiche
204. Kikongo
205. Kikuyu
206. Kimbundu
207. Kinyarwanda
208. Kiribati
209. Kirundi
210. Kisiha
211. Klingon
212. Korean
213. Kuanua
214. Kulung
215. Kurdish (Kurmanji)
216. Kurdish (Sorani)
217. Kwanyama
218. Kyrgyz
219. Lacid
220. Lao
221. Latin
222. Latvian
223. Limburgs
224. Lingala
225. Lingao
226. Lingua Franca Nova
227. Lithuanian
228. Lojban
229. Lomwe
230. Low German
231. Lower Sorbian
232. Lozi
233. Luba-Kasai
234. Luba-Katanga
235. Luganda
236. Lukpa
237. Lun Bawang
238. Lunda
239. Luvale
240. Luxembourgish
241. Maale
242. Macedonian
243. Madurese
244. Maithili
245. Makhuwa
246. Malagasy
247. Malay
248. Malay trade and creole
249. Malayalam
250. Maltese
251. Mam
252. Mambwe-Lungu
253. Manipuri (Latin)
254. Manx
255. Maori
256. Mapuche
257. Maranao
258. Marathi
259. Mari
260. Marshallese
261. Mauritian Creole
262. Metlatónoc Mixtec
263. Middle French
264. Mirandese
265. Mizo
266. Mongolian (Cyrillic)
267. Mongolian (Traditional)
268. Montenegrin
269. Mossi
270. Motu
271. Muthuvan
272. Nahuatl
273. Nateni
274. Navajo
275. Ndau
276. Ndonga
277. Ndyuka
278. Nepali
279. Ngaju
280. Nias
281. Nigerian Fulfulde
282. Nigerian Pidgin
283. Niuean
284. Nkore
285. Northern Grebo
286. Northern Mam
287. Northern Puebla Nahuatl
288. Northern Sami
289. Northern Sotho
290. Norwegian
291. Numanggang
292. Nyakyusa
293. Nyaneka
294. Nyemba
295. Nynorsk
296. Nyungwe
297. Nzema
298. Occitan
299. Ojibwa
300. Old English
301. Oriya
302. Oroko
303. Oromoo
304. Ossetic
305. Paite
306. Pampanga
307. Pangasinan
308. Papantla Totonac
309. Papiamento
310. Paraguayan Guaraní
311. Pashto
312. Pele-Ata
313. Persian
314. Pijin
315. Plateau Malagasy
316. Plautdietsch
317. Pohnpeian
318. Polish
319. Poqomchi’
320. Portuguese
321. Potawatomi
322. Punjabi
323. Qeqchi
324. Queretaro Otomi
325. Quichua
326. Romani
327. Romanian
328. Roviana
329. Russian
330. Ruund
331. S'gaw Karen
332. Sabaot
333. Samberigi
334. Samoan
335. San Mateo del Mar Huave
336. San Salvador Kongo
337. Sangir
338. Sango
339. Sanskrit
340. Saramaccan
341. Sardinian
342. Scots
343. Scottish Gaelic
344. Sena
345. Serbian
346. Serbo-Croatian
347. Sesotho
348. Seychelles Creole
349. Shan
350. Shipibo
351. Shona
352. Shuar
353. Sidamo
354. Sindhi
355. Sinhalese
356. Siroi
357. Slovak
358. Slovenian
359. Somali
360. Songe
361. South Azerbaijani
362. South Bolivian Quechua
363. Southern Ndebele
364. Spanish
365. Suau
366. Sundanese
367. Swahili
368. Swazi
369. Swedish
370. Syriac
371. Tachelhit
372. Tagalog
373. Tahitian
374. Tajik
375. Tamajaq
376. Tamil
377. Tampulma
378. Tatar
379. Tedim Chin
380. Telugu
381. Tennet
382. Teso
383. Tetela
384. Tetun
385. Tetun Dili
386. Thai
387. Tigre
388. Timugon Murut
389. Tiv
390. Toba Batak
391. Tojolabal
392. Tok Pisin
393. Toki Pona
394. Tongan
395. Tooro
396. Tsimané
397. Tswa
398. Tswana
399. Tuma-Irumu
400. Tumbuka
401. Tungag
402. Turkish
403. Turkmen
404. Tuvaluan
405. Tuvan
406. Twi
407. Tzeltal
408. Tzotzil
409. Udmurt
410. Ukrainian
411. Uma
412. Umbundu
413. Upper Sorbian
414. Urdu
415. Urhobo
416. Uspanteco
417. Uzbek
418. Venda
419. Vietnamese
420. Vunjo
421. Wa
422. Wali
423. Wallisian
424. Walon
425. Waray
426. Waris
427. Waskia
428. Wayuu
429. Welsh
430. Western Bolivian Guarani
431. Western Bukidnon Manobo
432. Western Kayah
433. Western Lawa
434. Wolaytta
435. Wolof
436. Xhosa
437. Xitsonga
438. Yabem
439. Yapese
440. Yiddish
441. Yipma
442. Yom
443. Yongbei Zhuang
444. Yongkom
445. Yoruba
446. Yucatec Maya
447. Zande
448. Zarma
449. Zotung Chin
450. Zulu

== See also ==
- Apertium
- Baidu Fanyi
- DeepL Translator
- Google Translate
- Microsoft Translator
- Moses (machine translation)
- Yandex Translate
