= Wampi =

Wampi may be:

- a common name for the Clausena lansium, a tree species of Southeast Asia
- one local name for the rakali, a rodent of Australia
- one type of wampum beads traditionally used by some Native American peoples of the eastern United States

== See also ==
- Wampis language, of Peru
- Wampis people, an ethnic group of Peru
