= Achuar =

Indigenous peoples of the Americas

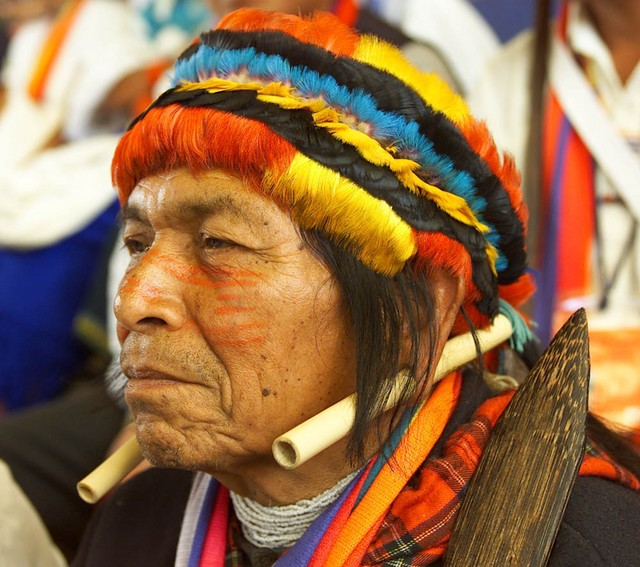

Regions with significant populations
- Ecuador: 7k, Peru: 12k

Languages
- Shuar language, Achuar dialect of Achuar-Shiwiar language

Religion
- Christian, Shamanism, Animism

Related ethnic groups
- Shuar, Aguarunas

The Achuar are an indigenous people of the Americas speaking a language belonging to the Jivaroan language family, alongside the Shuar, Shiwiar, Awajun, and Wampis (Perú). They live along the banks of the Pastaza River, Huasaga River, and on the borders between Ecuador and Perú. The word "Achuar" originates from the name of the large palm trees called "Achu" (Mauritia flexuosa) that are abundant in the swamps of their territory.

In the past, the Achuar were traditionally feared warriors by the Shuar, known for their relentless pursuit of enemies. During the Cenepa War, the Achuar from Ecuador and Peru formed an alliance and maintained a neutral stance.

== Lifestyle ==
=== Households ===
Achuar life centers on the domestic household, which consists of a nuclear family unit often including close relatives. Although the Achuar ideal is household autonomy and a subsistence economy, there are usually about ten to fifteen relatively close households working together while dispersed throughout the area. Each of these groups tends to be uxorilocal. Marriages are typically polygynous, with partners somewhat related, or in some instances women are taken from nearby groups during raids. Co-wives are often sisters (see sororal polygyny).

The standard Achuar home is settled near a river or lake, but at some distance from major waterways because of mosquitoes and to protect the household against raids by canoe. It is shaped as a large oval, commonly without outer walls to allow ventilation, with a high roof with straight sides. The roof is often made out of palm tree fronds while two types of palm are used for house beams. Temporary walls are made out of large palms when danger seems close. A large yard and gardens then surround the home on the outside. The size of a house plays a pivotal part in the ego of an Achuar man. The bigger the house is to fit multiple wives and children the more likely that man will be considered a juunt, or "great man".

Conflicts within the Achuar society are minimal. The constant fight is between neighboring tribes and when tensions greatly increase, the Achuar find refuge in large protected houses that hold six to seven families.

=== Tasks ===
Women and men hold separate daily tasks that are all beneficial for the survival of a family. The women gather and carry the game, sometimes with their children, while also preparing meals. They also have the opportunity to fish with baskets or with lines but overall their role pertains to domestic duties. Men, on the other hand, work in the forest and hunt. They are also involved in making the tools they use for hunting, like blowguns and traps, and use the technique of clearing for the expansion of their spouses’ gardens.

Gardens are maintained solely by women, at least three days a week. They comprise a large quantity and variety of plant species, but their value delves much deeper than just a source of food. Women can find sanctuary in their gardens and express their grief and suffering in private, as public emotion is spurned. Women also give birth to their children in there, demonstrating the importance of gardens in Achuar lives.

The Achuar follow a lunar calendar of seasonal resources, like the fish season, which is divided into days, moons, and year.

Aside from the everyday routine, there still remains time for leisure. Thirty-five percent of the day is spent on subsistence production, leaving the rest of the day open. Men and young boys have more time for relaxation compared to women who still have house chores to complete. Before being married, young boys do nothing all day while adolescent girls work in the garden. During the rest of the day, married men drink manioc beer and talk amongst each other while also doing handiwork, for example woodwork.

== Language ==
The Achuar ethnic group forms part of the conjunction of the Shuar and forms one of the four dialect groups that constitute the linguistic family of the Shuar (Achuar, Shuar, Aguaruna y Huambisa).

The Achuar speak a Shuar language and Achuar-Shiwiar language, dialects of the Jivaroan languages. Achuar Chicham or Achuar are related to other languages such as Shuar Chicham but they differ greatly with the Awajunt language (except for some words and phrases). For this reason, some researchers believe they are not from the Jivaroana family. In the Achuar language, there are only four vowels: a, e, i, u. The 'e' is pronounced differently. The alphabet consists of 21 letters a, aa, ch, e, ee, i, ii, j, k, m, n, p, r, s, sh, t, ts, u, uu, w, y.

== Religion and cosmology ==
Shamanism is present in Achuar lifestyle and witchcraft is occasionally practiced by both ritual specialists and laypersons. An example of this is an institutionalized form of reciprocal violence that entitles a person to revert any harmful incidents or material another sent. Jivaroans, of which the Achuar are a sub-group, ascribe to a particular form of the pan-Amazonian animistic cosmological phenomenon known as 'Amazonian perspectivism,' in which many animals and plants are understood to possess human-like souls, although their bodily appearance is different. Animals with human-like souls are significant for the Achuar, as they are a form of socialized nature. The only way for a hunter to be successful is to live in harmony with the game he hunts and with its guardian spirits, known as kuntiniu nukuri (literally: "game mothers"). The hunter's relationship with both the prey and their "game mothers" is personal and cultivated over a lifetime, and these relationships are characterized principally as affinal. He must follow these two rules: taking these animals with moderation and showing respect to the animals he kills. Both of these rules of hunting are codified in cautionary myths.

The Achuar believe that nonhuman people possess souls which have the ability to communicate through language and signs. This is sometimes experienced during soul journeys, known as arutam encounters, which represent an extreme state of self-awareness and are induced by the consumption of hallucinogenic drink. Ayahuasca is a ritual sacrament in Achuar religion. Dreams are essential for the Achuar as they are not only revealing, but also can be foretelling. Prior to engaging in any form of predatory behavior, whether warfare, hunting, or some forms of fishing, men often insist upon having a dream.

Self-control is a fundamental aspect of Achuar beliefs, which is taught at a young age. Men exercise discipline to show will power and strength and the best place to display this is in their own home. Examples of self-control would be avoiding gluttony, being able to go without sleep, and not wasting anything. As well, another form of control would be over their expressions and attitudes, especially in front of visitors. Evading eye contact is key or else a sense of aggression might arise and mouths are covered when speaking. Saliva is the only product of the body that is publicly exposed. This is because female saliva is believed to be a source of fermentation of the manioc beer and male saliva is socially incorporated into the speech of a conversation.

Gardens are watched over by the spirit of gardens, Nunkui. Women sing anents, magical songs, as a medium to communicate with their plants, Nunkui, and other particular objects. The songs are extremely personal so they are either sung in the head or on an instrument, but always in secret. Each anent has basically the same melodic structure but different lyrics. Yet gardens can also be perilous at times, specifically manioc which is believed to have traits of vampirism. Children are the main targets of the manioc and thus are not allowed to enter a garden without supervision. Blood is precious in the eyes of the Achuar who believe there is a finite amount of blood in each person and when lost it can never be replaced, therefore quickening death.

== Death ==
The traditional form of burial for the Achuar is placing the deceased person in a hollowed-out log, resembling a canoe. During the funeral of a head of household, the canoe is buried in the middle of the house in remembrance of the continuing presence of the late figure. The Achuar view there being a role for the remaining body parts of a dead body. These limbs acquire a life of their own and assume the bodies of certain animals.

== History ==
Settlers first wrote about the Achuar in 1548. They avoided prolonged European contact until the 20th century. Christian missionaries began seriously intruding into Achuar society in the 1940s and 1950s.

== Non-Indigenous influence ==
Due to the development of the Amazon Rainforest, the Achuar people's population and livelihood have been declining. When oil was discovered in the Amazon in 1964 oil companies began to seize land for development and profit. Due to these land seizures, Achuar were forced to attack oil infrastructure throughout the Amazon. This caused the Achuar to be removed from their territory in favor of oil companies. Non-Indigenous contact has also seen introduction of deadly diseases (including new STDs) and deaths related to pollution from oil spills, illegal business practices, and violent interactions.

In multiple but not all cases, oil spills of various degrees have been compensated by simple burial. Major oil pipelines run above rivers that the Achuar depend on for bathing and drinking. When these oil pipelines break the rivers become polluted poisoning the rivers the Achuar need to live. Violent conflicts with non-Indigenous people have arisen between oil company employees and the native Achuar. As in much of the Amazon Basin, indigenous sexual practices differ from those in non-Indigenous populations, and modern "safe sex" practices are very poorly disseminated thereby putting at risk their population and culture. As a consequence, some advocates claim that non-Indigenous contact contributes to a majority of indigenous deaths.

== Jaime Vargas Vargas ==
Jaime Vargas Vargas is an indigenous leader who presides over the Confederation of Indigenous Nationalities of Ecuador and took part in the 2019 Ecuadorian protests.

== Nase Lino ==
Nase Lino is an Ecuadorian filmmaker and communicator of Achuar ethnicity, known for his work in promoting and preserving Amazonian culture through documentary filmmaking. He directed Taking Ayahuasca (Natémamu) - Achuar, a renowned documentary exploring the ancestral ritual within the Achuar nation.
