= Achuar–Shiwiar language =

Chicham language spoken in Peru and Ecuador

Shiwiar
- Shiwiar chicham
- Pronunciation: [ʃiwʲár t͡ʃit͡ʃam]
- Native to: Peru, Ecuador
- Ethnicity: Achuar people, Shiwiar
- Native speakers: 1,200 (2020)
- Language family: Chicham: Nuclear Chicham?; Shiwiar
- Dialects: Shiwiar; Achuar

Language codes
- ISO 639-3: acu
- Glottolog: achu1248
- Shiwiar is classified as Severely Endangered by the UNESCO Atlas of the World's Languages in Danger.

Shiwiar (Shiwiar: Shiwiar chicham, Achuar-Shiwiar pronunciation: [ʃiwʲár t͡ʃit͡ʃam]), also known as Jivaro and Maina, is a Chicham language spoken along the Pastaza and Bobonaza rivers in Ecuador. Shiwiar is one of the thirteen indigenous languages of Ecuador. All of these Indigenous languages are endangered.

== Classification ==
Shiwiar is a member of the Chicham languages, also known as "Jivaroan", derived from a Spanish corruption of the common Chicham designation for themselves, *ʃíwar. This family consists of Shiwiar, Achuar, which is typically considered a dialect of Shiwiar, Shuar, Huambisa (Wampis), and Aguaruna (Awajun). However, the term "Jivaro" has negative connotations, and has been replaced in recent times by Chicham 'language', as suggested by Tuntiak Katan Jua, a Shuar linguist. All of the languages except for Aguarona are closely related, and have been described as a dialect continuum.

== Speakers ==
Shiwiar is spoken by the Achuar people of the Amazonian region of Ecuador. The Achuar people also speak Spanish, Shuar, and Kichwa along with their native language, Shiwiar.

Although the Achuar live in the Amazon Basin, the extracting of oil and raw materials from Ecuador through mining has displaced the Achuar communities and endangered their homes.

While Ecuador's official language is Spanish, the Achuar people along with other indigenous groups have the right to use their own languages in education through the official language policies of Ecuador legalized in Decree No. 000529, Article 27, and the Dirección Nacional de Educación Indígena Intercultural Bilingüe (DINEIIB).

== Phonology ==
Consonant phonemes
| | Labial | Dental/ Alveolar | Postalveolar/ Palatal | Velar | Glottal |
|---|---|---|---|---|---|
| Stop | p | t | | k | |
| Nasal | m | n | | ŋ | |
| Affricate | | ts | tʃ | | |
| Fricative | | s | ʃ | | h |
| Tap | | ɾ | | | |
| Approximant | w | | j | | |

/t, n/ are phonetically dental as [t̪, n̪]. /ŋ/ has a very limited distribution as it only recently acquired phonemic status. Stops and affricates are usually voiced following a nasal consonant. /h/ is palatalized to [ç] when it is preceded by a front-high vowel. When /ɾ/ immediately follows a nasal, an epenthic voiced stop may optionally be inserted between them. For some speakers, /h/ can be realized as a voiceless velar fricative [x]. /w/ has no velar articulation, and it is realized as a labio-dental approximant [ʋ] or a bilabial approximant [β̞] when followed by /i/.

Vowel phonemes
| | Front | Central | Back |
|---|---|---|---|
| Close | i ĩ | ɨ ɨ̃ | u ũ |
| Open | | a ã | |

Vowels in Shiwiar have much allophonic variation. All two-vowel sequences, except for */iɨ/ and */ɨi/, can form diphthongs. /a/ is typically realized as [ɐ, ə] in unnaccented syllables. If a low vowel is immediately preceded or followed by /i/, or preceded by a palatalized consonant, /a/ is sometimes realized as a mid-low [ɛ] or mid front vowel [e̞]. In the vicinity of /w/, /a, ã/ are often realized as [ʌ, ʌ̃], whereas /ɨ, ɨ̃/ are often realized as [ɤ, ɤ̃]. /ɨ/ may also be heard as a high back vowel [ɯ] when preceding labial consonants /p, m/.

== Bibliography ==
- Mowitz, G.; Warkentin de Fast, R.; Fast Warkentin, D. (1996), Diccionario achuar-shiwiar–castellano, Lingüística peruana, 36 (in Spanish), Lima: Instituto Lingüístico de Verano
