= Aguaruna =

Aguaruna may refer to:

- Aguaruna people, an ethnic group of Peru
- Aguaruna language, their language
