= Machine translation in China =

Machine translation in China is the history of machine translation systems developed in China. China became the fourth country that began machine translation (MT) research following USA, UK, and the Soviet Union. In 1957, the Language Institute of Chinese Academy of Sciences took the initiative in Russian-Chinese MT research program and set up an MT research group. From then on the research activities were directed and applied for academic purposes in Universities. The turning point of MT systems launching initiatives in market began from 1990s. MT systems went into blossom into the market. Among these systems, there were commercialized MT systems. To be more specific, Transtar was the first commercialized MT system and has been constantly upgraded. What's more, IMC/EC MT system which was developed by Computer Institute of Chinese Academy of Sciences has further made great advancement. Meanwhile, the practical MT system MT-IT-EC specific to communication domain was also striking to notice, for it has greatly improved the efficiency and productivity in the issue of publications.

Government funding is a critical component and support in the development of market-oriented machine translation in China. It is evident to see that since Chinese opened up to the outside world and joined the WTO, the vigorous import and export trade generate opportunities for machine translation to transfer technical terms of products into the readable target information. Facing the increasing demand of sophisticated state-of -the -art translation technology, the academic area including research institute and universities are even launching bachelors’ and master's programs regarding machine translation. Thus, strong evidence illustrates the promising field of machine translation in the future market of China.

== See also ==
- Baidu Fanyi
- NiuTrans
- Translators Association of China
