= Mujeres Amazónicas =

Environmental rights group

Mujeres Amazónicas (Amazonian Women)
- Formation: 2013 - Present
- Purpose: Environmental Justice; Gender Equality / Women's Rights; Indigenous Rights
- Location: Ecuadorian Amazon
- Leader: Patricia Gualinga, Margoth Escobar, Salomé Aranda and Nema Grefa

Mujeres Amazónicas Defensoras de la Selva de las Bases frente al Extractivismo (English: Amazonian Women Defending the Forest from Extractivism), also known as Mujeres Amazónicas (English: Amazonian Women), is an Indigenous environmental rights group. The group is made up of more than 100 women from seven nationalities of the Ecuadorian Amazon and advocates for the protection of nature, territory, women's rights, health, education, and Indigenous culture in Ecuador.

== History ==
Mujeres Amazónicas began their activism in 2013 in response to the Ecuadorian government selling oil concessions to companies, allowing for the exploration and extraction of oil within certain areas. The organization consists of women from various backgrounds and ages, specifically from the nations affected by exploration and extraction: the Achuar, Shiwiar, Sápara, Waorani, Shuar, Kichwa and Andoas. Leaders of the group include Patricia Gualinga, Margoth Escobar, Salomé Aranda, and Nema Grefa.

== Activism ==
Mujeres Amazónicas' activism focuses on addressing the effects of extractivism in Ecuador, including oil extraction, deforestation, mining, violations of Indigenous rights, climate change, and violence against women. Their activism is said to include elements of ecofeminism, a branch of feminism that considers environmentalism and the relationship between women and the earth as central to its practice.

In October 2013, Indigenous organizations from the southeastern Ecuadorian Amazon took part in a 250-kilometre (160 mi) march to Quito, Ecuador's capital. This was a response to the eleventh oil licensing round in their territories, which would allow for oil extraction. In the same year, they proposed a case to the Ecuadorian National Assembly to declare the Amazon Kawsak Sacha, or a “Living Forest,” which would encourage practices that build mutual relations between non-human and human entities in the Amazon.

In 2017, Mujeres Amazónicas met with Ecuador's President, Lenin Moreno, to demand changes to oil and mining practices in their territories. In December of the same year, he agreed to a moratorium on new auctions of oil and mining concessions unless informed and prior consent was given by local communities. However, in February of 2018, Moreno’s government announced a new oil auction and sold a number of new mining concessions.

In March of 2018, Mujeres Amazónicas, along with other Indigenous activist groups, organized a march to the capital of Ecuador, Quito, with the goal of meeting with President Lenin Moreno once again. Mujeres Amazónicas sought to present their Mandate of Grassroots’ Amazonian Women Defenders of the Rainforest Against Extractivism, which outlined 22 demands addressing land rights, climate change, and gender-based violence. However, these demands remain unmet.

Through their activism and collaboration with organizations such as Amazon Watch, Mujeres Amazónicas have increased global awareness of Ecuador’s Indigenous struggle to protect and conserve their environment.
