= Achuar dialect =

Language spoken by the Achuar

Achuar
- Achual
- Native to: Ecuador, Peru
- Ethnicity: Achuar
- Native speakers: 20,000 (2011)
- Language family: Chicham: Nuclear Chicham?; Achuar–Shiwiar; Achuar

Official status
- Recognised minority language in: Ecuador, Peru

Language codes
- ISO 639-3: –
- Glottolog: achu1249
- Achuar is classified as Definitely Endangered by the UNESCO Atlas of the World's Languages in Danger.

The Achuar dialect, known as Achuar Chicham and Achual, is an indigenous language and dialect of Shiwiar spoken by the Achuar community. This ethnic group resides in the regions of the Pastaza, Bobonaza, Morona, Macusari, Tigre, Huasaga, and Corrientes rivers, located in Peru and Ecuador.

Approximately 50% of Achuar language speakers are literate. Only 1% of those who speak Achuar as a second language are literate, as the majority prefer to use Spanish.

== Phonology ==
Consonant phonemes
| | Bilabial | Alveolar | Postalveolar | Palatal | Velar | Glottal |
|---|---|---|---|---|---|---|
| Nasal | m | n | | | ŋ | |
| Stop | p | t | | | k | ʔ |
| Affricate | | ts | tʃ | | | |
| Fricative | | s | ʃ | | x | |
| Approximant | | | | j | w | |
| Tap | | ɾ | | | | |

Vowel phonemes
| | Front | Central | Back |
|---|---|---|---|
| Close | i ĩ iː | | u ũ uː |
| Close-mid | | ɘ ɘ̃ ɘː | |
| Open | | a ã aː | |

- /i/ and /u/ have slightly lowered allophones [ɪ] and [ʊ], respectively.
- /a, ã, aː/ are phonetically central [a̠, ã̠, a̠ː].
  - /a, ã/ (but not the long /aː/) have the following allophones: open central unrounded [a̠, ã̠], open-mid front unrounded [ɛ, ɛ̃], close-mid front unrounded [e, ẽ] and close-mid back rounded [o, õ].

== Orthography ==
In the Achuar language, there are four vowels: a, e, i, u. The alphabet consists of 21 letters: a, aa, ch, e, ee, i, ii, j, k, m, n, p, r, s, sh, t, ts, u, uu, w, y.

== Sample text ==
Aints ainauti mash metek nuwanmaya akiniauwitji. Turasha ankan penker pujusmi tusar akiniauwitji. Aintstikia mash ii nintijai paan nintimratnuitji, turasha penker aa nu nekaatnuitji. Aints pasé aa nusha nekaatnuitji. Turasha ii pataichiri ainaujai penker nintimtunisar pujuiniana nunisrik chikich aintsjaisha penker nintimtunisar pujustinuitji.

Translation: "All human beings are born free and equal in dignity and rights. They are endowed with reason and conscience and should act towards one another in a spirit of brotherhood." (First article of the Universal Declaration of Human Rights)

== Bibliography ==
- Fast Mowitz, G. (1975), Sistema fonológico del idioma achual (in Spanish), Lima: Instituto Lingüístico de Verano
- Lev, Michael; Stark, Tammy; Chang, Will (2012). "Phonological inventory of Achuar-Shiwiar". The South American Phonological Inventory Database (version 1.1.3 ed.). Berkeley: University of California: Survey of California and Other Indian Languages Digital Resource.
