= Palta language =

Extinct language of Ecuador

Palta
- Native to: Ecuador
- Region: Loja Province
- Ethnicity: Palta people
- Era: 16th century
- Language family: Chicham?: Palta

Language codes
- ISO 639-3: None (mis)
- Glottolog: None

The Palta language is an extinct language of the Ecuadorian Amazon, formerly spoken by the Palta people.

== Classification ==
Jacinto Jijón y Caamaño (1936) classified it as a Chicham language. Kaufman (1994) states that there is "little resemblance", but Adelaar (2004) finds the connection reasonable. In addition to the four words below are toponyms, which commonly end in -anga, -numa, -namá. The latter two suggest the Chicham locative case suffix -num ~ -nam, and Torero (1993) notes that the last resembles Aguaruna (Chicham) namák(a) 'river' as well.

The Malacato language, spoken to the south of Loja, was found in the same "language complex" as Palta. Mason (1950) also lists Malacata as an alternate name for Palta.

== Vocabulary ==
The variety of Palta spoken at Xoroca is attested by only a few words: yumé 'water', xeme 'maize', capal 'fire', let 'firewood' (Jiménez de la Espada, 1586), and some toponyms.

== Bibliography ==
- Jiménez de la Espada, Marcos, ed. (1965 [1586]): Relaciones geográficas de Indias: Perú, 3 vols. Biblioteca de Autores Españoles 183–5. Madrid: Atlas.
- Jijón y Caamaño, Jacinto (1936–8): Sebastián de Benalcázar, vol. 1 (1936) Quito: Imprenta del Clero; vol. 2 (1938) Quito: Editorial Ecuatoriana.
- Jijón y Caamaño, Jacinto (1940–5): El Ecuador interandino y occidental antes de la conquista castellana, vol. 1 (1940), vol. 2 (1941), vol. 3 (1943), vol. 4 (1945). Quito: Editorial Ecuatoriana (1998 edition, Quito: Abya-Yala).
