= Baidu Fanyi =

Translation service

- Website type: Neural machine translation
- Available in: 201 languages and language varieties
- Owner: Baidu
- Website: fanyi.baidu.com
- Commercial: Yes
- Current status: Active

Baidu Fanyi is a service for translating text paragraphs and web pages provided by Baidu.

In 2015, Baidu Translation won the second prize of China's National Science and Technology Progress Award.

== Supported languages ==
Baidu translate has some languages that are missing from Google Translate, such as Cornish, albeit some of them are poor quality.

As of September 2026, translation is available in 201 languages:

1. Acehnese
2. Afrikaans
3. Akan
4. Albanian
5. Algerian Arabic
6. Amharic
7. Ancient Greek
8. Arabic
9. Aragonese
10. Armenian
11. Assamese
12. Asturian
13. Aymara
14. Azerbaijani
15. Balochi
16. Bashkir
17. Basque
18. Belarusian
19. Bemba
20. Bengali
21. Berber
22. Bhojpuri
23. Bilin
24. Bislama
25. Bosnian
26. Brazilian Portuguese
27. Breton
28. Bulgarian
29. Burmese
30. Canadian French
31. Cantonese
32. Catalan
33. Cebuano
34. Cherokee
35. Chichewa
36. Chinese (Simplified)
37. Chinese (Traditional)
38. Chuvash
39. Classical Chinese
40. Cornish
41. Corsican
42. Creek
43. Crimean Tatar
44. Croatian
45. Czech
46. Danish
47. Dhivehi
48. Dutch
49. English
50. Esperanto
51. Estonian
52. Faroese
53. Filipino
54. Finnish
55. French
56. Friulian
57. Fulani
58. Gaelic
59. Galician
60. Georgian
61. German
62. Greek
63. Greenlandic
64. Guaraní
65. Gujarati
66. Haitian Creole
67. Hakha Chin
68. Hausa
69. Hawaiian
70. Hebrew
71. Hiligaynon
72. Hindi
73. Hmong
74. Hungarian
75. Hupa
76. Icelandic
77. Ido
78. Igbo
79. Indonesian
80. Ingush
81. Interlingua
82. Inuktitut
83. Irish
84. Italian
85. Japanese
86. Javanese
87. Kabyle
88. Kannada
89. Kanuri
90. Kashmiri
91. Kashubian
92. Khmer
93. Kinyarwanda
94. Klingon
95. Kongo
96. Konkani
97. Korean
98. Kurdish
99. Kyrgyz
100. Lao
101. Latgalian
102. Latin
103. Latvian
104. Limburgish
105. Lingala
106. Lithuanian
107. Lojban
108. Low German
109. Lower Sorbian
110. Luganda
111. Luxembourgish
112. Macedonian
113. Maithili
114. Malagasy
115. Malay
116. Malayalam
117. Maltese
118. Manx
119. Māori
120. Marathi
121. Marshallese
122. Mauritian Creole
123. Middle French
124. Montenegrin
125. N'Ko
126. Neapolitan
127. Nepali
128. New Norwegian
129. Northern Sámi
130. Northern Sotho
131. Norwegian
132. Occitan
133. Ojibwa
134. Old English
135. Oriya
136. Oromo
137. Ossetian
138. Pampanga
139. Papiamento
140. Pashto
141. Persian
142. Polish
143. Portuguese
144. Punjabi
145. Quechua
146. Romani
147. Romanian
148. Romansh
149. Russian
150. Rusyn
151. Samoan
152. Sanskrit
153. Sardinian
154. Scots
155. Serbian (Cyrillic)
156. Serbian (Latin)
157. Serbo-Croatian
158. Shan
159. Shona
160. Silesian
161. Sindhi
162. Sinhala
163. Slovak
164. Slovenian
165. Somali
166. Songhai
167. Southern Ndebele
168. Southern Sotho
169. Spanish
170. Sundanese
171. Swahili
172. Swedish
173. Syriac
174. Tagalog
175. Tajik
176. Tamil
177. Tatar
178. Telugu
179. Tetum
180. Thai
181. Tigrinya
182. Tsonga
183. Tunisian Arabic
184. Turkish
185. Turkmen
186. Twi
187. Ukrainian
188. Upper Sorbian
189. Urdu
190. Venda
191. Vietnamese
192. Walloon
193. Welsh
194. West Frisian
195. Wolof
196. Written Norwegian
197. Xhosa
198. Yiddish
199. Yoruba
200. Zazaki
201. Zulu

== See also ==
- Machine translation in China
- DeepL Translator
- Google Translate
- Microsoft Translator
- NiuTrans
- Yandex Translate
