= Margoth Escobar =

Ecuadorian human rights activist

- Born: 1953 or 1954 (age 71–72)
- Occupations: Indigenous rights activist, Environmentalist
- Years active: 1975–present
- Organization: Provincial Union of Peasant Organizations of Manabi (Unión Provincial de Organizaciones Campesinas de Manabí)

Margoth Escobar (born 1953 or 1954) is an Ecuadorian activist for environmental and indigenous rights.

== Personal life ==
Escobar is mestizo, and was born in Puyo, Pastaza.

== Activism ==
Escobar, an Amazonian woman, opposes extraction of natural resources in the Ecuadorian Amazon.

In 1975 Escobar helped create the Provincial Union of Peasant Organizations of Manabi (Unión Provincial de Organizaciones Campesinas de Manabí), which was significant in the recovering the rural lands of several families in Manabí Province.

== Judicial harassment ==
Escobar was accused of assaulting the director of Belorusneft, Andrey Nikonov, and was summoned by the prosecutor's office in 2014, accused of sabotage and terrorism.

On 13 August 2015, Escobar was beaten and arrested following a general strike and demonstration in Puyo, which had been organized by the union of trade workers and indigenous organizations including Confederación de Nacionalidades Indígenas del Ecuador – Conaie (Confederation of Indigenous Nationalities of Ecuador). The demonstrations called for agrarian reform, better access to health services, opposition to mining development, a free trade agreement with the European Union, and opposition to a proposed amendment of the Constitution of Ecuador that would have allowed President Rafael Correa to be re-elected indefinitely. A judge ruled that she should remain in preventative detention for 30 days, to stop her from disturbing the peace. In December 2015 the charges were dropped due to lack of evidence.

== Arson attack ==
Margoth's home was destroyed by arson on September 29, 2018. The house had been a meeting place for Mujeres Amazónicas, the Amazon Women's collective, of which she is a member. Also known as Colectivo de Mujeres Amazonicas, the largely indigenous group defends the Ecuadorian Amazon.

Other Mujeres Amazónicas members Nema Grefa, Patricia Gualinga, and Salomé Aranda, had also been attacked and threatened, and the group, in conjunction with Amnesty International, collected and delivered over 250,000 signatures to the Attorney General of Ecuador demanding progress in the stalled investigations. The signatures were delivered on 9 March 2015.
