= Palta people =

Indigenous people of Ecuador

The Palta were an indigenous people of Ecuador. They once spoke the unclassified and scarcely attested Palta language.
