= Huambisa =

Indigenous people of Peru and Ecuador

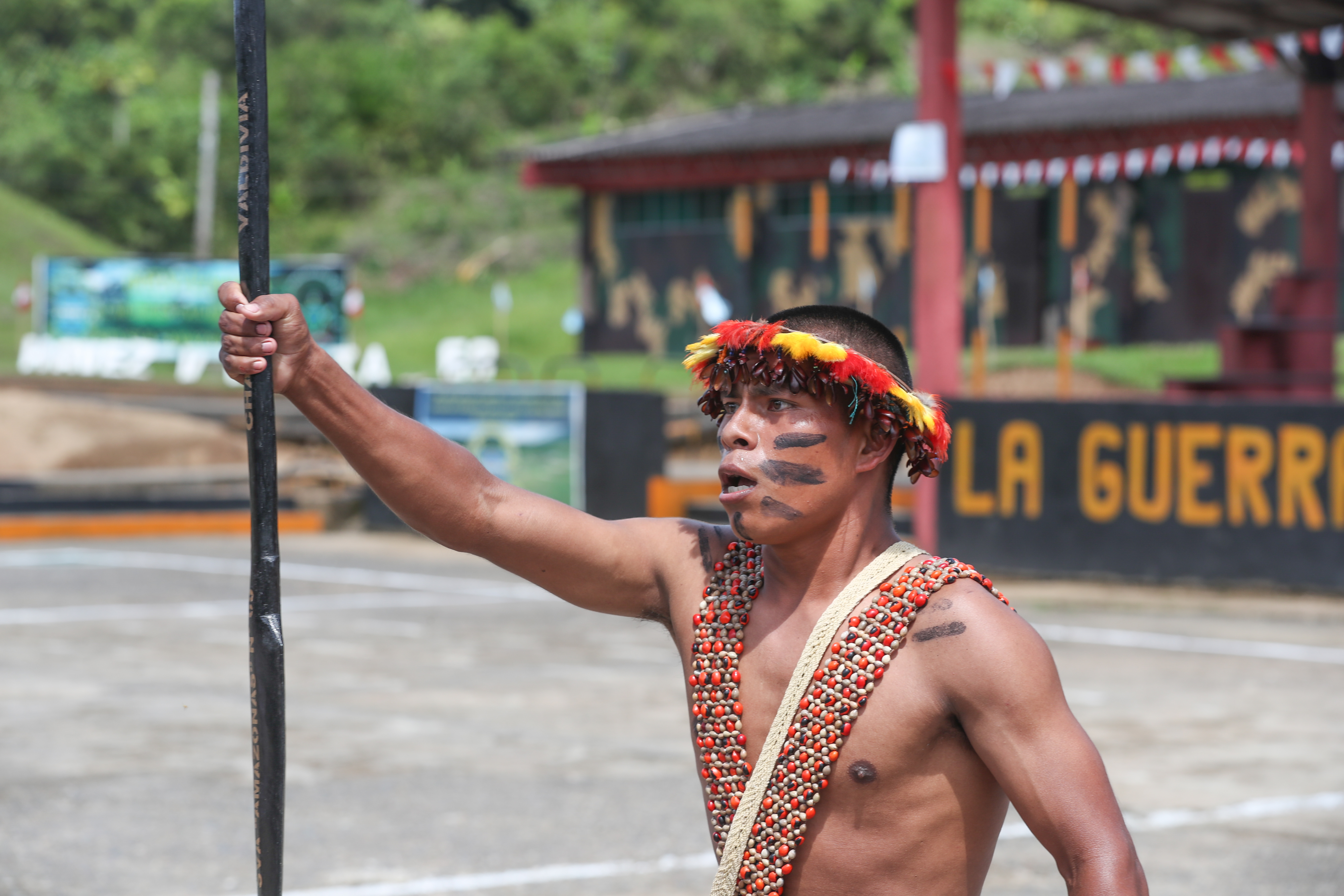
Huambisa, member of the Peruvian army

The Huambisa, also known as the Wampis, are an indigenous people of Peru and Ecuador. One of the Jivaroan peoples, they speak the Huambisa language and live on the upper Marañón and Santiago rivers. They numbered about 5,000 people in the 1980s.

== History ==
In the 15th and 16th centuries, the Huambisa faced several incursions by the Inca Empire. They consistently fended off the Inca, developing a strong culture of resistance in the process. After the Spanish conquered the Inca Empire in the 1530s, they too made attempts to subjugate the Huambisa.

The Huambisa first encountered the Spanish in 1549, and through the next decade the conquistador Juan de Salinas launched several incursions in their homeland. The Spanish established settlements and the encomienda labor system among the Huambisa, which resulted in a population decline. However, by the end of the 16th century, the Huambisa decimated the Spanish settlements and regained control of their land.

Spanish Jesuit and Franciscan missionaries made a series of attempts to evangelize the Huambisa in the 18th and 19th centuries, but all resulted in failure. During the Amazon rubber boom, there was an expedition in 1910 made by a rubber firm against the Huambisa territory near the Pongo de Manseriche. The purpose of this expedition was to entrap or enslave the local natives so that they could be used to extract rubber. At least sixty-seven people on this expedition were killed in retaliation by the Huambisa natives. As late as the 1930s, the Huambisa launched attacks on white settlers encroaching on their land.

The Huambisa have faced significant turmoil since the 1940s as their native land has been the subject of a border dispute between Peru and Ecuador. In 1999, the two countries settled the dispute with an agreement that the territory belonged to Peru. Since then, the Huambisa have faced additional disruption due to oil exploration in the area. By the 1980s, the Huambisa gained legal recognition of their ownership of their ancestral lands, making them one of the few indigenous peoples in South America who retain the territory they had prior to European colonization.

== Culture ==
The Huambisa mostly speak their traditional Huambisa language, one of the Chicham languages, but many know Spanish and Quechua. They are primarily agriculturists who grow crops, especially plantains and cassava but also tobacco, cotton, and other plants, using slash-and-burn methods. They supplement their diets with hunting and fishing.

As of the 1980s there were approximately 5,000 Huambisa, mostly living in their ancestral territory. They primarily live in small patrilineal communities that maintain political independence from one another. Each community lives together in a thatched longhouse, typically 80 feet long by 40 feet wide.
