= Huambisa language =

Jivaro language spoken in Peru

Huambisa
- Native to: Peru
- Ethnicity: Huambisa people
- Native speakers: 8,000 (2012)
- Language family: Jivaroan: Huambisa

Language codes
- ISO 639-3: hub
- Glottolog: huam1247
- ELP: Huambisa

Huambisa, Huambiza, Wambiza, Jíbaro, Xívaro, Wampis, Maina, or Shuar-Huampis is an indigenous language of the Huambisa people of Peru. Spanish colonizers first generated the name Xívaro in the late 16th century as a way of overgeneralizing several ethnicities of similar sociopolitical statuses within the region and referring to them as savages. It is an established language spoken in the extreme north of Peru. It is closely related to the Achuar-Shiwiar, Shuar, and Aguaruna languages, all of which belong to the Jivaroan language family. It has official standing in the area it is spoken.

== Classification ==
Huambisa belongs to the Jivaroan linguistic family, a small language family of northern Peru, specifically in Amazonas, Cajamarca, Loreto, and San Martin, and the Oriente region of Ecuador.

== Geographic Distribution ==
=== Official Status ===
The Huambisa language is largely spoken between the Condorcanqui Province of the Amazonas Region and the Datem del Marañón Province in the Loreto Region, precisely along the Santiago River, in which "Middle and Upper Santiago is considered Wampis territory." As of 2012, there were nearly 8,000 speakers of Huambisa worldwide, 5,000 of which live along the Morona and Santiago Rivers. It is currently present in most contexts and domains of communication, some things extending into medias in which Spanish is dominant. In the year 2010, it was declared official in the Amazonas Department together with Aguaruna and Chachapoyas Quechua. A new alphabet for the language was approved in 2012, which will allow for the integration of the indigenous language into the modern world.

=== Dialects/Varieties ===
Because of how closely the languages of the Jivaroan family are related, they are often thought of as to make up a dialectal continuum, in which Achuar and Shiwiar are related closely enough to be classified under an umbrella term of Achuar-Shiwiar, while speakers of Huambisa are able to distinctly recognize the differences in dialect. Therefore, speakers of Huambisa consider it a distinct language. Some possible subgroups of the Huambisa language include varieties such as that of the Upper Santiago, Middle Santiago, Katirpisa, and Morona. David Beasley and Kenneth L. Pike (1957) claim that sometimes with linguistic variation there is slight aspiration and that allophones are voiced following nasal consonants. Their studies are specific to the Wachiycu dialect. In a more recent dissertation written by Jaime Germán Peña, who did field research in communities in Kanus along the Santiago River studying the Santiago regional dialect, he opposes the appearance of any voiced mergers in said dialectal region.

== Phonology ==
Huambisa is phonetically related to Aguaruna. The Huambisa language has been studied as a subject of sound symbolism, which connects words through their phonological form to their semantic meanings. It is found in the Huambisa language correspondence among connotations of sounds relative to the words they describe within phonemes, meaning the sounds of the language are not only significant literally, but also symbolically. Much of what is known of Huambisan phonetics is specific to the Wachiycu dialect spoken along the Wachiyacu River and the dialect of the Santiago River region.

=== Consonants ===
The Huambisa language has 14 consonants, the majority of which are voiceless. The language has only one series of stops and affricates, consisting of 4 stops, /p/, /ṯ/, /k/, /ʔ/, and 2 affricates, /t͡s/ and /t͡ʃ/, of which the principal allophones are voiceless and unaspirated. In fact, articulation, as opposed to whether phonemes are voiced or voiceless, is the primary means of distinguishing between phonological consonants. There are 3 fricatives, /s/, /ʃ/, /h/, 3 nasal consonants, /m/, /n/, /ɲ/, one rhotic phoneme that alternates between the flapped [r] and an approximant, [ɺ], in which variation is entirely individual but the flap is most common, and one approximant semivowel /j/ that has a very limited use in the language except for as a part of the third-person past-tense suffix, -ji. The most recent work published on the Huambisa language considers the other two semivowels to be allophones, [w] being the positional allophonic realization of /u/, and /ɰ/ being that of /ɨ/.The following table gives the known consonant sounds of the Huambisa language, with pronunciation in IPA transcription.

	Bilabial	Alveolar	Palatal	Velar	Glottal
Stop	p	t̠		k	ʔ
Affricate		t͡s	t͡ʃ		
Fricative		s	ʃ		h
Nasal	m	n	ɲ		
Rhotic		r			
Approximant			j		

=== Vowels ===
The Huambisa language contains 8 vowels: the 4 oral vowels /a, i, ɨ, u/, and their nasal counterparts, /ã, ĩ, ɨ̃, ũ/, respectively. Huabisan vowels are characterized solely by "height, frontness/backness, and oral/nasal prosody." The following table shows the Huambisa vowel system of oral vowels and their nasal counterparts with pronunciation in IPA transcription.

	Front		Central		Back	
High	i	ĩ	ɨ	ɨ̃	u	ũ
Low			a	ã		

=== Phonotactics ===
Consonants are usually found in onset of the syllable, with the exception of /r/, /ɲ/ and /ʔ/. The only consonants to ever occupy the coda are the nasals /n/ and /m/.

== Grammar ==
=== Morphology ===
There is marked difference of significance between words with even the slightest morphological variation, and these specific words are paired with specific contexts.

=== Syntax ===
The language contains a complete set of grammar rules, including three unclear forms of verbs characterized by distinct suffixes which are added to root verbs like a form of conjugations. The suffix -tasa is intentionally added to a root word to form a verb, while the suffices -mu and -t indicate the verb is being nominalized or adjectified. The latter suffix, -t, is not commonly found in informal exchanges. The reason the verb forms have been deemed unclear by some scholars is because of inconsistency between root and suffix relationships. In some cases a single root verb can have various distinct meanings when the three different forms of suffices are added to the end. For example: takastasa (to work), takamu (completion/completed), and takat (cultivation/cultivated). In other cases a root word, no matter the suffix, retains a distinct meaning and instead follows the pattern described that is similar to conjugation. For example, atsaktsa, atsakamu, atsakat are verbal and nominal/adjective forms, respectively, of the root word "affiliate." The Huambisa language also contains two forms of nouns that also are not bound to strict syntactical rules. The only distinctly recognized suffix pattern for nouns is the suffix -n which represents nominalization or the accusative case of a noun. However, even with nominalization and in the accusative case, there are irregular suffices other than -n.

== Vocabulary ==
The Huambisa language has a wide vocabulary that has been extensively documented in the last century. The Huambisa lexicon is said to be similar to that of the Aguaruna language as well. The breadth of the Huambisa vocabulary can be mainly attributed to speakers' specification of context in their word choice. For example, the English verb "to open" applies to a wide range of objects which it can be acting upon, while the Huambisa lexicon contains at least 5 different words which mean "to open," all of which then have at least 3 conjugative forms. The word used is dependent on very specific contextual features. Uritsa/uraimu/urat refers to opening things like a bag, book, door, etc. Ijakratsa/ijakeamu/jakat and nakaktasa/nakamu/nakat refer to opening fruits like peanuts, cacao, sapota, etc. "To open" when referring to opening the eyes is iimtasa/iimiamu/iimat and the word "open" used to talk about opening the mouth is wagkatsa/wagkamu/waat, while to say "to make open the mouth" has a different word set entirely: iwagtasa/iwagmu/iwat.
