= Chicham languages =

Language family spoken in Peru and Ecuador

Chicham
- Jivaroan aent
- Geographic distribution: Peru
- Linguistic classification: One of the world's primary language families (Macro-Jibaro ?)
- Subdivisions: Shuar; Aguaruna; Huambisa; Shiwiar; ?Palta †

Language codes
- Glottolog: jiva1245
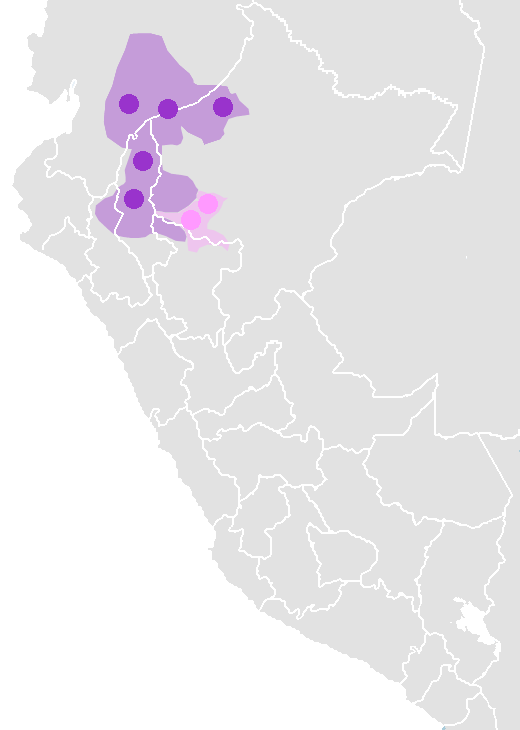
- Chicham (violet) and Cahuapanan (pink) languages. Spots are documented locations, shadowed areas probable extension in 16th century.

The Chicham languages, also known as Jivaroan (Hívaro, Jívaro, Jibaro), and natively as aent, is a small language family of northern Peru and eastern Ecuador, in Amazonas, Cajamarca, Loreto, and San Martin, Peru and the Oriente region of Ecuador.

== Genetic relations ==
The extinct Palta language was classified as Chicham by Jacinto Jijón y Caamaño about 1940 and was followed by Čestmír Loukotka, but Kaufman (1994) states that there is "little resemblance". However, only 4 words are known.

The most promising external connections are with the Cahuapanan languages and perhaps a few other language isolates in proposals variously called Jívaro-Cahuapana (Hívaro-Kawapánan) (Jorge Suárez and others) or Macro-Jibaro or Macro-Andean (Morris Swadesh and others, with Cahuapanan, Urarina, Puelche, and maybe Huarpe).

The language isolate Candoshi has also been linked to Chicham, as David Payne (1981) provides reconstructions for Proto-Shuar as well as Proto-Shuar-Candoshi.

== Language contact ==
Jolkesky (2016) notes that there are lexical similarities with the Quechuan, Kwaza, Taruma, Yanomami, Katukina-Katawixi, Kandoshi, Tupi, and Arawan language families due to contact. This suggests that Chicham had originated further downstream in the Central Amazon region.

== Family division ==
Chicham consists of four languages:

1. Shuar
2. Achuar-Shiwiar
3. Awajun
4. Huambisa

Extinct Palta may have been Chicham as well. Based on the word for 'water', it is possible that Tabancale was also a Chicham language.

=== Mason (1950) ===
Internal classification of the Chicham languages by Mason (1950):

- Chicham
  - Aguaruna
    - Alapico
    - Indanza
    - Iransa
    - Maranza
    - Santiago
    - Patocuma
    - Chiguasa
    - Yuganza
  - Wambisa
    - Uambisa
    - Cherembo
    - Chirapa
    - Chiwando
    - Candoa
    - Cangaime
    - Mangosisa
  - Achuale
    - Capawari
    - Copatasa
    - Machine
    - Pindu
    - Wampoya
  - Antipa
  - Maca
    - Walakisa
    - Zamora
    - Pintuc
    - Ayuli
    - Morona
    - Miazal
  - Upano
  - Bolona
  - Bracamoro (Pacamuru)

=== Jolkesky (2016) ===
Internal classification by Jolkesky (2016):

(† = extinct)

- Jivaro
  - Aguaruna
  - Palta †
  - Jivaro, Nuclear
    - Achuar-Shiwiar
    - Wambisa
    - Shuar

== Proto-language ==
Payne's (1981) Proto-Shuar reconstruction is based on data from Shuar, Achuar, Aguaruna, and Huambisa, while his Proto-Shuar-Candoshi reconstruction also integrates data from Candoshi and Shapra.

For reconstructions of Proto-Shuar and Proto-Shuar-Candoshi by Payne (1981), see the corresponding Spanish article.

== Bibliography ==
- Campbell, Lyle (1997). American Indian languages: The historical linguistics of Native America. New York: Oxford University Press. ISBN 0-19-509427-1.
- Dean, Bartholomew (1990). The State and the Aguaruna: Frontier Expansion in the Upper Amazon, 1541-1990. M.A. thesis in the Anthropology of Social Change and Development, Harvard University.
- Greenberg, Joseph H. (1987). Language in the Americas. Stanford: Stanford University Press.
- Greene, Landon Shane (2004). Paths to a Visionary Politics. PhD dissertation. University of Chicago.
- Kaufman, Terrence (1990). Language history in South America: What we know and how to know more. In D. L. Payne (Ed.), Amazonian linguistics: Studies in lowland South American languages (pp. 13–67). Austin: University of Texas Press. ISBN 0-292-70414-3.
- Kaufman, Terrence (1994). The native languages of South America. In C. Mosley & R. E. Asher (Eds.), Atlas of the world's languages (pp. 46–76). London: Routledge.
- Payne, David L. (1981). "Bosquejo fonológico del Proto-Shuar-Candoshi: evidencias para una relación genética." Revista del Museo Nacional 45. 323-377.
- Solís Fonseca, Gustavo (2003). Lenguas en la amazonía peruana. Lima: edición por demanda.
