= Aguaruna language =

Chicham language of Peru

Aguaruna
- Awajún
- Pronunciation: [ɑwɑhʊ́n̪]
- Native to: Peru
- Region: Northern Peru, upper Marañón River
- Ethnicity: Aguaruna people
- Native speakers: 53,400 (2007)
- Language family: Chicham: Aguaruna
- Early form: Proto-Jivaroan
- Dialects: Marañón Aguaruna; Nieva Aguaruna
- Writing system: Latin

Language codes
- ISO 639-3: agr
- Glottolog: agua1253
- ELP: Aguaruna
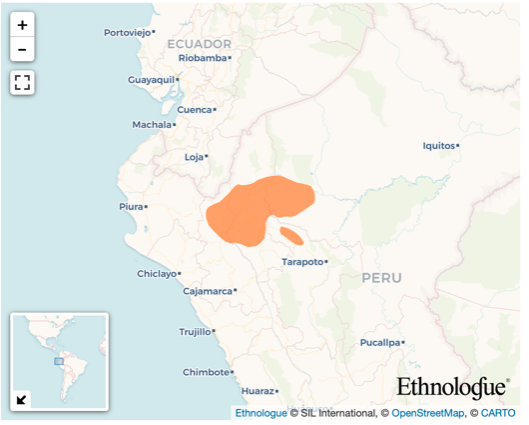

- Awajun is classified as Vulnerable by the UNESCO Atlas of the World's Languages in Danger.

Aguaruna (endonym: Awajún, pronounced [ɑwɑhʊ́n̪]) is an indigenous American language of the Chicham family spoken by the Aguaruna people in Northern Peru. According to Ethnologue, based on the 2007 Census, 53,400 people out of the 55,700 ethnic group speak Aguaruna, making up almost the entire population. It is used vigorously in all domains of life, both written and oral. It is written with the Latin script. The literacy rate in Aguaruna is 60–90%. However, there are few monolingual speakers today; nearly all speakers also speak Spanish. The school system begins with Aguaruna, and as the students progress, Spanish is gradually added. There is a positive outlook and connotation in regard to bilingualism. 50 to 75% of the Aguaruna population are literate in Spanish. A modest dictionary of the language has been published.

The speakers live in the Eastern foothills of the Andes, along the upper Marañón River and its tributaries. More specifically, its location includes the Amazonas, Cajamarca, Loreto, and San Martín regions, as well as the Cahuapanas, Mayo, and Potro rivers. There are two major varieties of Aguaruna: one spoken around the Nieva River, considered the more conservative variety, and the other spoken around the Marañón River. Within the Chicham family, there are four languages: Aguaruna, Huambisa, Shuar, and Achuar-Shiwiar. Speakers of Aguaruna claim mutual intelligibility with speakers of Huambisa, so there is speculation that the Chicham family may better be described as a dialect continuum. This language family shares many similarities to both the Amazonian and Andean languages, likely due to their close proximity and contact with one another. The language contains twelve consonants and four vowels that each have both oral and nasal forms. It has subject–object–verb word order, meaning the sentence structure is verb-final.

== Phonology ==
=== Consonants ===
The consonant system of Aguaruna includes all of the consonants included in the chart below. However, formally Aguaruna only contains twelve distinct consonant phonemes. They include the following: four stops, two affricates, three fricatives, two nasals, and a flap. Aguaruna shows a strong preference for unvoiced consonants, as only the nasal and flap phonemes are voiced. The labial stop [b] and the dental stop [d] exist only as oral allophones of the nasal obstruents /m/ and /n/, respectively, in defined phonological conditions, though these conditions may sometimes be lexical. There are three approximants included in the chart: [j], [w~ʋ], [ɰ]. They function as consonants within phonological processes, though they exist only as allophones of the vowels /i/, /u/, and /ɨ/, respectively. /j/ is written ⟨ñ⟩ when nasalized due to the following of a nasal vowel. The existence of [ŋ] as an allophone for [ɰ] is disputed. Note that [ʔ] does not appear with an orthographic equivalent in the chart below. This is because there is no consensus between speakers; it may be written with ⟨k⟩, ⟨t⟩, or ⟨h⟩. The glottal stop appears only in three lexemes, all intervocalically, and in a few interjections, so is quite rare and therefore not often written.

	Labial	Dental	Alveolar	Palatal	Velar	Glottal
Stops	p [p]	t [t]			k [k]	[ʔ]
Affricates			ts [t͡s]	ch [t͡ʃ]		
Fricatives			s [s]	sh [ʃ]		j [h]
Nasals	m [m]	n [n]				
Flaps			r [ɾ]			
Approximants	w [w~ʋ]			y/ñ [j]	g [ɰ]	

=== Vowels ===
Aguaruna has four vowels that each have an oral and nasal form, illustrated in the table below. The three high vowels often have the lowered allophones [ɪ], [ə], and [ʊ], from front to back. The only rounded vowel is [u]. Nasality is contrastive in pairs such as [ũha] 'open' versus [uha] 'tell', and [sũw̃ɨ̃] 'neck' versus [súwɨ] 'dark'. Nasal and oral vowels are often not distinguished in writing.

	Oral			Nasal		
	Front	Central	Back	Front	Central	Back
High (Close)	i	ɨ	u	ĩ	ɨ̃	ũ
Low (Open)	a			ã		

=== Syllable structure ===
The syllabic structure of Aguaruna is quite complex because the language contains many clusters of consonants and vowels. A nucleus may consist of short vowels, long vowels, diphthongs, and triphthongs, and processes like synaeresis and other vowel elisions further complicate it. The underlying syllable structure is (C)V(N): a vowel as the nucleus, an optional consonant as the onset, and an optional nasal segment as the coda, which may either be a nasal or a nasalized vowel. There are several processes that occur when producing the phonetic syllable. First, high vowels become glides and form onsets. Then, one syllable in each word gets a pitch accent (see section below for more details). Next, vowels adjacent to one another merge to create one nucleus as either a long vowel, diphthong, or triphthong. Finally, processes of vowel elision occur. Syllables may either be light or heavy. Light syllables contain one vowel and are open (CV). Heavy syllables may contain a complex nucleus or a coda: CVV(V)(C) or CVC. Aguaruna has a minimum word requirement of two phonological syllables.

There are several conditions for forming glides from high vowels. The general rules are as follows:

1. (V)VVV → (V)V.GV where G is the glide allophone. For example, /pa.ɨ.a.ta/ 'sugarcane' becomes /pa.ɰa.ta/.
2. VVaV → V.GaV For example, /i.u.a.i.na/ 'show' becomes /i.wa.i.na/.

Word-initial /i, u/ are realized as [j, w] when in front of a non-identical vowel. For example, /i.u.mi/ 'water' becomes /ju.mi/. Note that [ɰ] cannot appear in the word-initial position.

Aguaruna also experiences three types of vowel elision: apocope, syncope, and diphthong reduction. Apocope takes precedence; the nucleus of the final light syllable (CV) is deleted. For example, /nahana-ta/ 'to create' becomes [nahánat], as the final vowel is deleted. If there is a syllable-final nasal, then this creates a heavy syllable and apocope is blocked. When CV roots appear without a suffix, their vowels are lengthened, creating an underlying structure of two syllables, even if the surface form is monosyllabic.

For example, /búu.kɨ/ 'ice' has two underlying syllables, but it is pronounced as [búuk] with one syllable.

Syncope is the internal deletion of a nucleus. For example, /hɨ.̃ ɰa-nu.ma-i.a/ 'from the house' becomes [hɨɰ̃́ãñmaja]. Notice that the [u] is dropped internally, but the processes of glide formation and nasalization occur as well. In the process of diphthong reduction, a sequence /CaV/ becomes /CV/, where V is a high vowel. For example, /ami-nau/ 'yours' is realized as [áminu].

=== Accent ===
Aguaruna has a pitch accent. This means that in every word, one syllable carries an accent and is pronounced with a higher pitch than the rest of the word. This accent is phonemically contrastive, and many minimal pairs exist. For example, /ʃíki/ is 'to urinate (on something)' and /ʃikí/ means 'draw water.' The accent always is assigned to the nucleus of an underlying phonological syllable, though it may not always correspond to a surface syllable. Due to processes such as synaeresis, the accent may fall on a long vowel or diphthong. If this is the case, then it will have a rising or falling pitch contour with the underlyingly accented vowel as the locus.

There are two different patterns for assigning pitch accent: one for verbs and one for nouns and adjectives. Verbal roots and suffixes often have an underlying lexically specific accent. When forming verbs, the leftmost underlying accent becomes the surface pitch accent. If there is no underlying accent, then the pitch accent falls on the second vowel of the root.

For example, the root taka 'work' does not have an underlying accent, but the imperative suffix -ta does, so it becomes takastá 'work!' However, in the case of 'I will work,' the suffixes do not have an underlying accent so the pitch accent falls on the second vowel in takástathai.

In nouns and adjectives, the placement of the pitch accent depends on case. The accusative suffix shifts the accent one syllable to the right from the place where the nominative accent falls. For example, in the nominative form of 'tooth' the accent falls on the first vowel dái, but in the accusative form the accent shifts to the second vowel in daín.

=== Phonological processes ===
One important phonological process that occurs in Aguaruna is nasalisation. As mentioned above, nasality of vowels has a contrastive distribution with many minimal pairs. When found on a vowel, nasality spreads to the surrounding contiguous vowels and glides, but is blocked by consonants and word boundaries.

For example, the word /tu-ĩ-ia/ 'from where?' contains a nasal high front vowel and this property spreads so that the word is pronounced [tũw̃iỹã]̃.

There is some speculation that all nasal vowels arise from underlying syllable-final nasal segments that lack a specified articulator. Evidence for this theory can be found in the alternation between nasal V and VN in the word-final position.

For example, /ɨtsaN/ 'sun' is pronounced as [ɨt́sã] and /yutaiN/ is pronounced as [yútãĩ].

In addition, words in Aguaruna also may undergo denasalisation in certain conditions. This occurs in situations where the nasals /m, n/ are sounded by a sequence of contiguous oral vowels and sonorants when no nasal vowels are present. The result is either partial or complete denasalisation of /m/ and /n/, which are then pronounced as /b/ and /d/ respectively.

This may occur in the beginning of a word: /míʃu/ 'cat' becomes [bíʃu] and /nɨḱa/ 'know' becomes [dɨḱa]. This may also occur internally: /yamái/ 'now, today' becomes [ya^{m}bái] and /ináuk/ 'sweet potato' becomes [i^{n}dáuk]. Note that these two examples display only partial denasalisation, which is generally the case in intervocalic position. Note that denasalisation typically does not happen in words that contain a single /a/ in the word-final position.

=== Orthography ===
The usual orthography is summarized in the following table. Official Awajun alphabet does not represent vowel nasality nor considers glottal stops. The Centro Amazónico de Antropología y Aplicación Práctica (CAAAP), a Catholic research institution, as well as texts from the Summer Institute of Linguistics, include former diacritics for nasality and glottal stops. Both official and CAAAP alphabets inherit its use of ⟨g⟩ from an old phonological analysis, now considered disproved, according to which there existed a phoneme */ŋ/ underlying both intervocalic [ɰ] and velar nasal phone [ŋ]. Though not the official alphabet nor the CAAAP one, other orthographic practices have included letter ⟨ñ⟩ for the nasalized palatal approximant phone [j̃]. Word accent is usually marked, if at all, by means of an acute accent ⟨´⟩ upon vowel letters just in 3 or more syllable words.

Official alphabet (Note: According to Peruvian Ministry of Culture.)	Phonetic realizations	Phoneme correspondence	CAAAP orthography (Note: Cfr. Antunce Paati, P., Esash Shawit, E., Paz Suikai, I., Tiwi Paati, F., Uwarai Yagkug, A., & Regan Mainville, J. (2020). Diccionario awajún-castellano, castellano-awajún/ Awajún chícham apáchnaujai (2.a ed.). CAAAP/ Fe y Alegría..)
a	[a], sometimes allophones [ɛ ~ ə ~ o]	/a/	a
a	[ã], sometimes allophones [ɛ̃ ~ ə̃ ~ õ]	/ã/ or nasalized /a/	a̠
b	[ᵐb ~ b ~ m]	/ᵐb/	b
ch	[t͡ʃ], sometimes allophone [ʃ] (Note: Phoneme /t͡ʃ/ is usually pronounced [ʃ] in word-final position.)	/t͡ʃ/	ch
d	[ⁿd ~ d]	/ⁿd/	d
e	[ɨ ~ ɯ]	/ɨ/	e
e	[ɨ̃]	/ɨ̃/ or nasalized /ɨ/	e̠
g [between vowels]	[ɰ ~ ɰ̃]	/ɨ/ or epenthetic phone (Note: Sometimes not a phonemic but an epenthetic glide between identical vowels, as in pagat /paata/ [pa'ɰat] 'sugar cane')	g [between vowels]
g [elsewhere]	[ŋ]	/h/ (Note: /h/ tends to be pronounced [ŋ] in coda position in some Awajun dialects.) or /n/ (Note: /n/ is pronounced [ŋ] before /k/.)	g [elsewhere]
	[ʔ]	/ʔ/	h or -
i	[i ~ ɪ]	/i/	i
i	[ĩ ~ ɪ̃]	/ĩ/ or nasalized /i/	i̠
j	[h ~ h̃]	/h/	j
k	[k], sometimes allophone [x] (Note: /k/ is pronounced [x] before /h/.)	/k/	k
m	[m]	/m/	m
n	[n], sometimes allophones [ɲ ~ ŋ] (Note: /n/ assimilates its articulation point before a stop.)	/n/	n
r	[ɾ ~ l]	/ɾ/ (Note: Non-productive phoneme /ɾ/ is reduced to some Spanish or Wampis loans.) (sometimes used for writing /t/ [ɾ] (Note: /t/ is pronounced [ɾ] before /h/.))	r
s	[s]	/s/ (sometimes used for writing /t͡s/ [s] (Note: /t͡s/ is usually pronounced [s] in coda position (including word-finally) and following a consonant.))	s
sh	[ʃ]	/ʃ/ (sometimes used for writing /t͡ʃ/ [ʃ] (Note: /t͡ʃ/ is usually pronounced [ʃ] in coda position (including word-finally) and following a consonant.))	sh
t	[t], sometimes allophone [ɾ] (Note: /t/ is pronounced [ɾ] before /h/.)	/t/	t
ts	[t͡s], sometimes allophone [s] (Note: /t͡s/ is usually pronounced [s] in coda position (including word-finally) and following a consonant.)	/t͡s/	ts
u	[u ~ ʊ]	/u/	u
u	[ũ ~ ʊ̃]	/ũ/ or nasalized /u/	u̠
w	[w ~ β ~ ʋ ~ w̃ ~ β̃ ~ ʋ̃] (Note: Sequence /ui/ when the first segment is realized as a glide is always pronounced [βi].)	/u/ or epenthetic phone	w
y	[j ~ j̃]	/i/	y

== Morphology ==
Aguaruna's affixes consist solely of suffixes. Suffixes function to convey a number of meanings, such as tense markers, subject markers, case markers, mood markers, and more. Most suffixes are consonant-initial because stems are always vowel-final. However, sometimes there are vowel-initial suffixes, and when this happens the two vowels must fuse together. Usually the stem-final vowel and the suffix-initial vowel fuse in the rule V1 V2 → V2, where the stem-final vowel is dropped.

For example, when tu 'say' is combined with the subject nominalizer -inu, /tu-inu/ becomes tínu 'teacher.' However, sometimes there are exceptions to this rule. One instance of this is when the plural imperfect -ina fuses with a stem-final /i/ or /ɨ/, then it takes V1. For example, /wɨ-ina-wa-i/ becomes wɨ́nawai 'they are going'.

=== Allomorphy ===
Some suffixes may alternate between a short and long allomorph, depending on either phonological or morphological conditions. These conditions are specific to each morpheme. An example of a phonological context occurs for the exclamative copula in third person. The least conditioned form is -a, for example /aɨntsu-a/ becomes aɨńtsua 'it's a person!' However, when the suffix is immediately followed by /a/, then the suffix takes the longer form -ya, such as when /tuna-a/ combines to create túnaya 'it's a waterfall!'

One example of allomorphy on the basis of morphological conditions is the suffix -ki which indicates 'transferred action.' When this suffix is followed by the immediate past third person suffix -ɨ̃, then it takes its longer allomorph -kini. When combining the morphemes /hu-ki-ɨ̃/ the -ki becomes -kini, so the final product is hukínɨ ̃ 'he's taken (it).'

=== Reduplication ===
There are several instances of partial reduplication in Aguaruna. It is created by copying the first syllable as well as the onset, nucleus, and, if applicable, diphthong, but not coda, of the second syllable of the root. The reduplication is placed as its own phonological word preceding that which it copied from, and it carries its own pitch accent. The most common occurrence of reduplication is to show a repetitive action of a verb with the -kawa suffix.

For example, /asu/ is reduplicated in /asuti-ina-kawã/ to create ásu asutínakũa 'hitting and hitting.'

Though rare, reduplication can also occur in non-verbal words. For example, the suffix -ima 'even' must always be preceded by reduplication of the noun.

The phrase nuwái nuwáima ipámatuã 'having invited even the women' is formed by reduplicating /nuwa-ima/ 'woman-EVEN' to create nuwái nuwáima 'even the women.'

== Syntax ==
=== Sentence structure ===
Aguaruna typically prefers verb-final clauses. Though the word order is pretty flexible due to the presence of case markers, the direct object almost always immediately precedes the verb. The typical word order is as follows: SOV, where S represents the subject, O represents the direct object, and V is the verb. Aguaruna has a strong preference for transitive and ditransitive verbs, so the presence of intransitive clauses is minimal. If the sentence contains an indirect object, then it may fall into one of two positions: (S)OVE or (S)EOV, where E represents the indirect object. Under some circumstances, O may fall in clause-initial position, such as in the case of pronominal O arguments. For example, in the sentence mina amɨ dakumahukata 'take a photo of me' the pronominal object mina 'me' precedes the subject amɨ 'you'.

Aguaruna contains a person hierarchy for object marking. The hierarchy is: 1SG > 2SG > 1PL/2PL > 3, where first person plural and second person plural are equally ranked. Note that third-person objects are never marked. Typically, object marking tends to prefer E to be higher ranked than O.

=== Noun phrases ===
The minimal noun phrase consists of a head noun or a modifier in a headless construction. A noun phrase has a head noun or pronoun. The head noun may be preceded by an optional determiner and the head noun may be followed by one or more modifiers (adjectives and a small set of human nouns). There are three classes of complex noun phrases: simple, possessive, and apposed name. The structure of the simple noun phrase is: [(DET) N (Modifier)]. The structure of the possessive noun phrase is: [ (N:GEN_{Possessor}) N PERT_{Possessum} ]. (PERT stands for pretensive suffix which attaches to the noun stem, preceding inflectional suffixes.) The structure of the apposed name noun phrase is: [N N_{ProperName}].

=== Case marking ===
Aguaruna is a nominative/accusative language. It indicates the nominative, accusative, commutative, locative, ablative, instrumental, vocative, and genitive cases by attaching inflectional suffixes. Case markers attach only to the final element of a noun phrase, unless a demonstrative pronoun is present, then each word within the noun phrase takes the case marking. The nominative case does not take a suffix, but the noun phrase therefore cannot take any other case suffix, which in turn acts as the indicator that it is the subject.

The accusative suffix is -na, which is used to mark both direct objects and indirect objects. However, when the subject of a clause is first person plural, second person singular, or second person plural, then only first person singular objects take accusative case. For example, in the sentence núwa hapímkutʃin ɨŋkɨáu 'the women put their brooms (in baskets)', núwa 'women' takes no suffix because it is the nominative case, and hapímkutʃin 'brooms' takes the accusative case -na, though the [a] has been lost in apocope. On the other hand, in the sentence tsabáu yuwáta 'eat a banana!' there is no accusative suffix on tsabáu 'banana' because the subject is 'you (singular)'.

The genitive case historically was derived from the accusative case through the process of apocope. The genitive form is always identical to the accusative form, except that the final /-n/ has been deleted. Historically, possession was once marked by the accusative suffix, but was lost due to the common occurrence of word-final nasal deletion in Aguaruna. The genitive indicates possession by attaching to the possessor and is immediately followed by the possessed. For example, in the noun phrase waʃí yakahĩ ́ 'the monkey's arm', the genitive form waʃí 'monkey's' is derived from the accusative form of 'monkey' waʃín.

The comitative case is used to demonstrate accompaniment, and it is marked with the suffix -haĩ. For example, in the sentence nĩ yatʃĩhaĩ ikama wɨinawai 'he and his brother are going into the forest', we see that yatʃĩhaĩ 'his brother' takes the comitative suffix.

The locative case may be used to indicate location, as well as movement towards or into. There are two morphologically conditioned suffixes: -(n)ĩ appears on demonstratives and following pertensive suffixes, and -numa appears in all other conditions.

The instrumental case is formed with the suffix -(a)i. For example, in the sentence kámaɾai dakumkámi 'let's take a photo with the camera', kamaɾa 'camera' takes the suffix -i to form kámaɾai 'with the camera.'

The ablative case is formed by adding the suffix -ia. For example, kanusa 'Santiago River' gets the suffix -ia to create kanúsia 'from the Santiago River'.

The vocative case can only be used with human referents in Aguaruna. All nouns marked with the vocative case experience a shift of the accent to the final syllable. However, this may be because of the way speakers deliver it with a shout, rather than because of a morphological process. There are three ways to mark the vocative case, and all three suppress apocope. There are two unproductive suffixes: -ta and -wa. For example, yátsu 'brother' takes -ta to produce yatsutá. Meanwhile, ápa 'father' takes -wa to produce apawá. The only productive vocative form involves suppression of apocope and the accent shift to accent-final. For example, díitʃ 'uncle' becomes diitʃí 'uncle-VOC' and páblo 'Pablo' becomes pabló 'Pablo-VOC'.
