= Shuar language =

Chicham language spoken in Ecuador

Shuar
- "Jivaro"
- Shiwar chicham
- Native to: Ecuador
- Region: Morona-Santiago Province, Pastaza Province
- Ethnicity: Shuar
- Native speakers: 35,000 (2007)
- Language family: Chicham: Shuar

Official status
- Recognised minority language in: Ecuador

Language codes
- ISO 639-3: jiv
- Glottolog: shua1257
- ELP: Shuar

Shuar ('people', also known by the derogatory term Jivaro, also spelled Chiwaro, Jibaro, or Xivaro) is an indigenous language spoken by the Shuar people of Morona Santiago Province and Pastaza Province in the Ecuadorian Amazon basin.

== Classification ==
The Shuar language, as it stands today, is considered part of the Chicham (or Jivaroan) language family.

== Education ==
=== Radio schools ===
The geographical remoteness within the Ecuadorian rainforest isolates the Shuar and has widely scattered the people from one another. As a result, in the late 1960s, radio schools were formed to promote communication and education in both Spanish and Shuar. This inadvertently transformed into a language revitalization initiative for the Shuar people. Radio schools were shut down in 2001 and replaced with formal bilingual in-class teaching.

== Phonology ==
=== Consonants ===
	Bilabial	Alveolar	Palatal	Velar
Nasal	m	n		ŋ
Plosive	p	t		k
Affricate		t͡s	t͡ʃ	
Fricative		s	ʃ	h
Trill		r		
Semivowel			j	w

=== Vowels ===
	Front	Central	Back
Close	i ĩ	ɨ ɨ̃	u ũ
Open		a ã	

== Literature ==
The Constitution of Ecuador has been translated in its entirety into the Shuar language. Its official name in Shuar is Ecuador Nunka Umíktin Umpuarma.

== Sample text ==
The following text is an official translation of part of Article 2 of the Constitution of Ecuador which stipulates the language policy of the State.

Akánu 2.- ... Ecuador nunkanmanka apach chicham máshi chicháji; apach chicham, kichwa chicham, nuyá shuar chicham másh chichaktiniaiti anturnaikiatai tusar. Chíkich Tarimiat aents chichamen chichainia nuka núumtak nii nunkénink, chichasartatui, umiktin tana nuna umiak, chicham menkakaink tusa ii nunké arantuk, chichaktinian émtikiattui.

Translation in English: "Article 2.- ... Spanish is Ecuador's official language; Spanish, Kichwa and Shuar are official languages for intercultural ties. The other ancestral languages are in official use by indigenous peoples in the areas where they live and in accordance with the terms set forth by law. The State shall respect and encourage their preservation and use."
