= Kené =

Traditional geometric designs from Peru

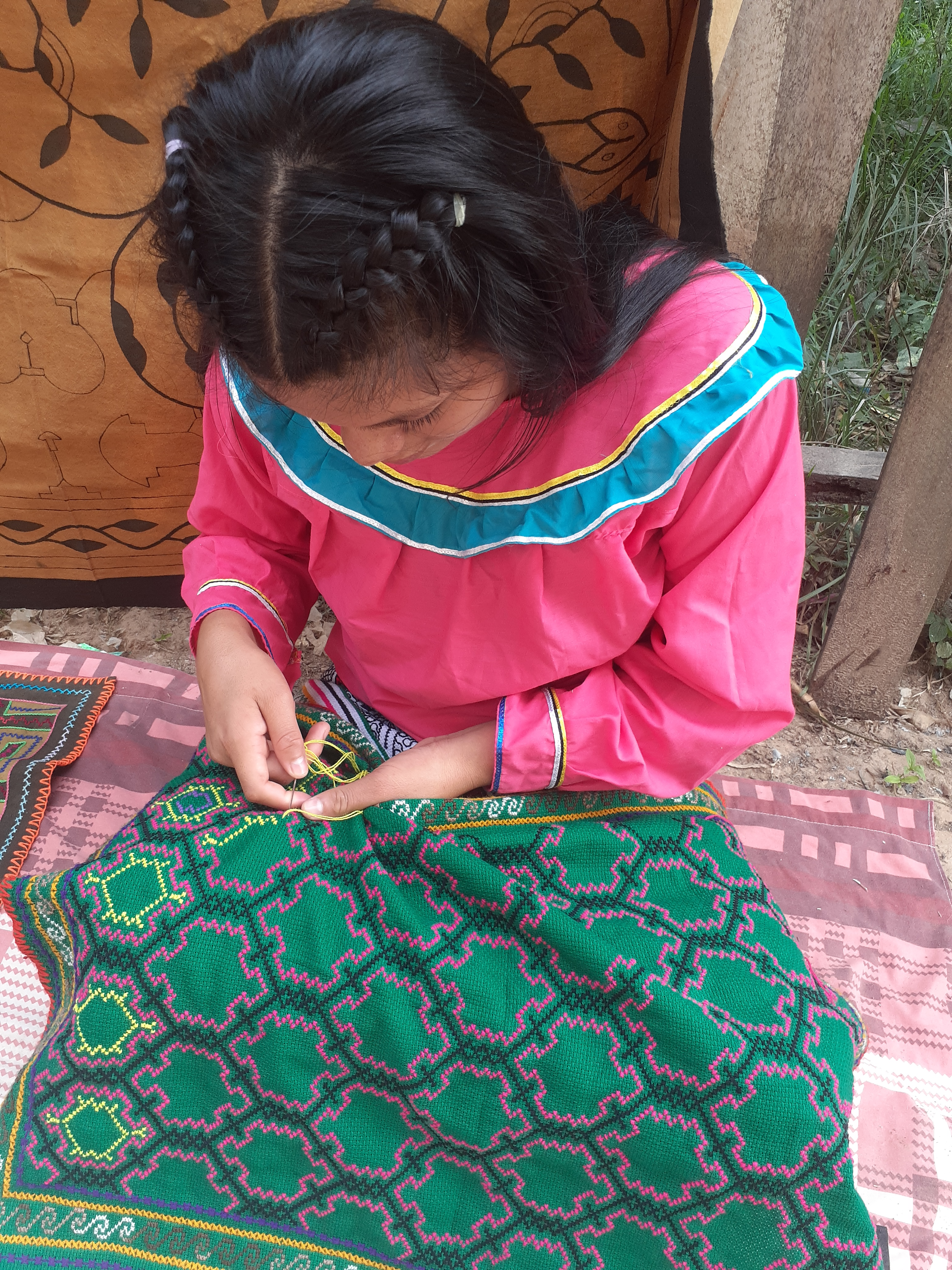
Kewé embroidery on textile performed by a Shipibo woman

The term kené, or kene, refers to the traditional designs painted by women and men on ceramics, textiles, wooden surfaces, and bodies of the Shipibo-Conibo people from the central Amazon of Peru. Kené designs are composed of geometric patterns that express the Shipibo worldview and spirituality, which tends to seek beauty and balance of the self in relation to the natural environment. When the design is embroidered on a textile, it is called kewé. On April 16, 2008, they were declared part of the Cultural Heritage of the Nation in Peru.

== Origin ==
In the Shipibo-Conibo language, the term jakon nete (composed of the words jakon 'good' and nete 'world') refers to the spiritual world of traditional Shipibo medicine. This term can be translated as the "good world" or "the land without evil". When the Shipibo visionary healer (meraya or onanya) establishes a deep connection with the jakon nete, this link is called kano. The designs generated in the imagination from this deep link with the jakon nete are called kene.

A good part of the designs are inspired by dreams, visions of ayahuasca, diets with master plants and nature itself. There are plants called piripiri whose extracts are applied to the eyes and navel of the young Shipibo that gives knowledge of kené designs for healing. Many plants and animals present kené: the main one is the anaconda (rono ewa, ronin), considered the mother of designs. The ipo kené plant (Fittonia albivenis) and the ipo fish have kené on the leaves and on the head, respectively.

== Cultural significance ==
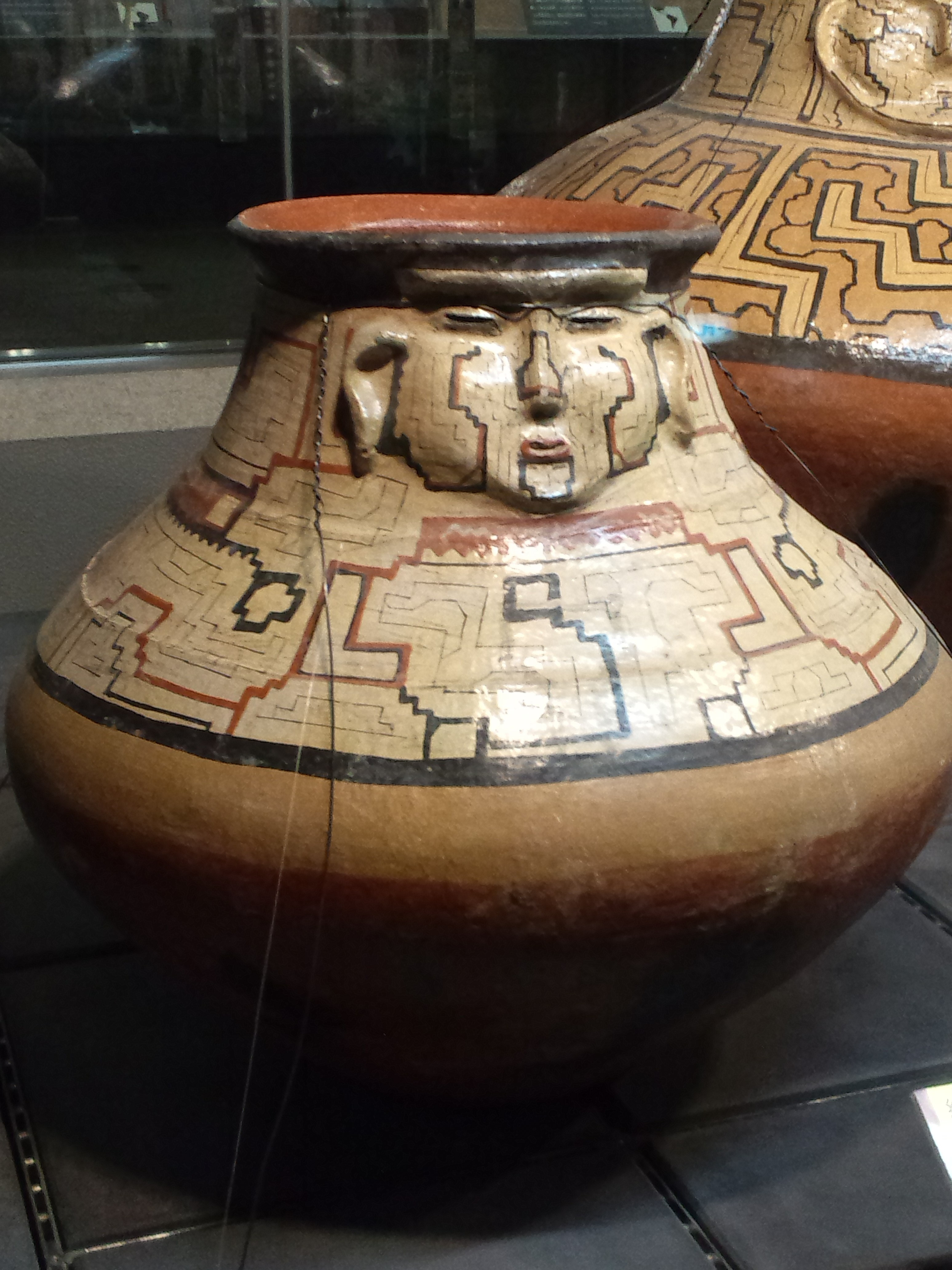
Kené in ceramic vessel

The kené designs are part of the cultural identity and are markers of the ethnic identity of the Shipibo-Conibo people. These designs are painted on the body (face), wooden utensils (oars, pipes, maces), textiles (skirts, shirts ) and ceramics. Traditionally it is women who transfer the designs on ceramics, textiles and the body, while men carve the designs on wooden utensils. When they are embroidered on textiles they are called kewé.

=== Contemporary uses ===
Beyond the painting of the kené on wood, textiles and ceramics, Shipibo women, considered artists in modern times, also paint them on public murals in urban environments as a form of cultural resistance. Likewise, many national and foreign tourists buy textiles with kené designs for decorative purposes in their homes. Many tourists and anthropologists interpret kené as representations of visions during psychedelic experiences. Bernd Brabec de Mori and Laida Mori Silvano de Brabec state that the designs predate the use of the ayahuasca by the Shipibo people.

=== Misunderstanding of the kene as a code ===
Some persons have asserted that there is a relationship between the patterns of kené designs and sacred chants (íkaros or, in the Shipibo language: besho). Fernando Portal and María Jesús Shultz stated that kené, being a code inscribed "on a tangible medium, operates visually and aurally, since, by tracing it with the fingers, it guides Shipibo men and women to express an íkaro." However, Bernd Brabec de Mori and Laida Mori Silvano de Brabec state that the "discussed geometric designs (kené and kewé) serve to indicate ethnic identity, beauty, and quality, but that no evidence of a code is found." Although the lyrics of the chants refer to kené, there is no correspondence between the geometric patterns and a musical structure in the designs.

== See also ==
- Icaro
- Guillermo Arévalo
- Pablo Amaringo
- Shipibo language

== Bibliography ==
- Favarón, Pedro; Bensho, Chonon (2022). "Rao bewa: los cantos medicinales del pueblo shipibo-konibo". Literatura: teoría, historia, crítica. 24 (2): 139–165. doi:10.15446/lthc.v24n2.102082.
- Belaunde, Luisa Elvira (2016). "Chapter 7: "Kené": Shipibo-Conibo Design". Fieldiana. Anthropology (45): 81–92. ISSN 0071-4739.
- Belaunde, Luisa Elvira (2015). ""Revivir a la gente": Herlinda Agustín, onaya del pueblo shipibo-konibo". Mundo Amazónico. 6 (2). Leticia, Colombia: Instituto Imani de la Universidad Nacional de Colombia: 131–146. doi:10.15446/ma.v6n2.54498. ISSN 2145-5074.
- Brabec de Mori, Bernd (2011). "Tracing Hallucinations: Contributing to a Critical Ethnohistory of Ayahuasca Usage in the Peruvian Amazon". In Labate, Beatriz Caiuby; Jungaberle, Henrik (eds.). The Internationalization of Ayahuasca. Zürich: LIT Verlag Münster. p. 23-48. ISBN 978-3-643-90148-4.
- Mori, Bernd Brabec de; Brabec, Laida Mori Silvano de (2009-01-01). "La corona de la inspiración. Los diseños geométricos de los shipibo-konibo y sus relaciones con cosmovisión y música". INDIANA - Estudios Antropológicos sobre América Latina y el Caribe (in Spanish). 26: 105–134. doi:10.18441/ind.v26i0.105-134. ISSN 2365-2225.
- Lauriout, Erwin; Day, Dwight; Loriot, James (1993). Diccionario Shipibo-Castellano. Ministerio de Cultura.
