= Tina Kunakey =

French model and actress (born 1997)

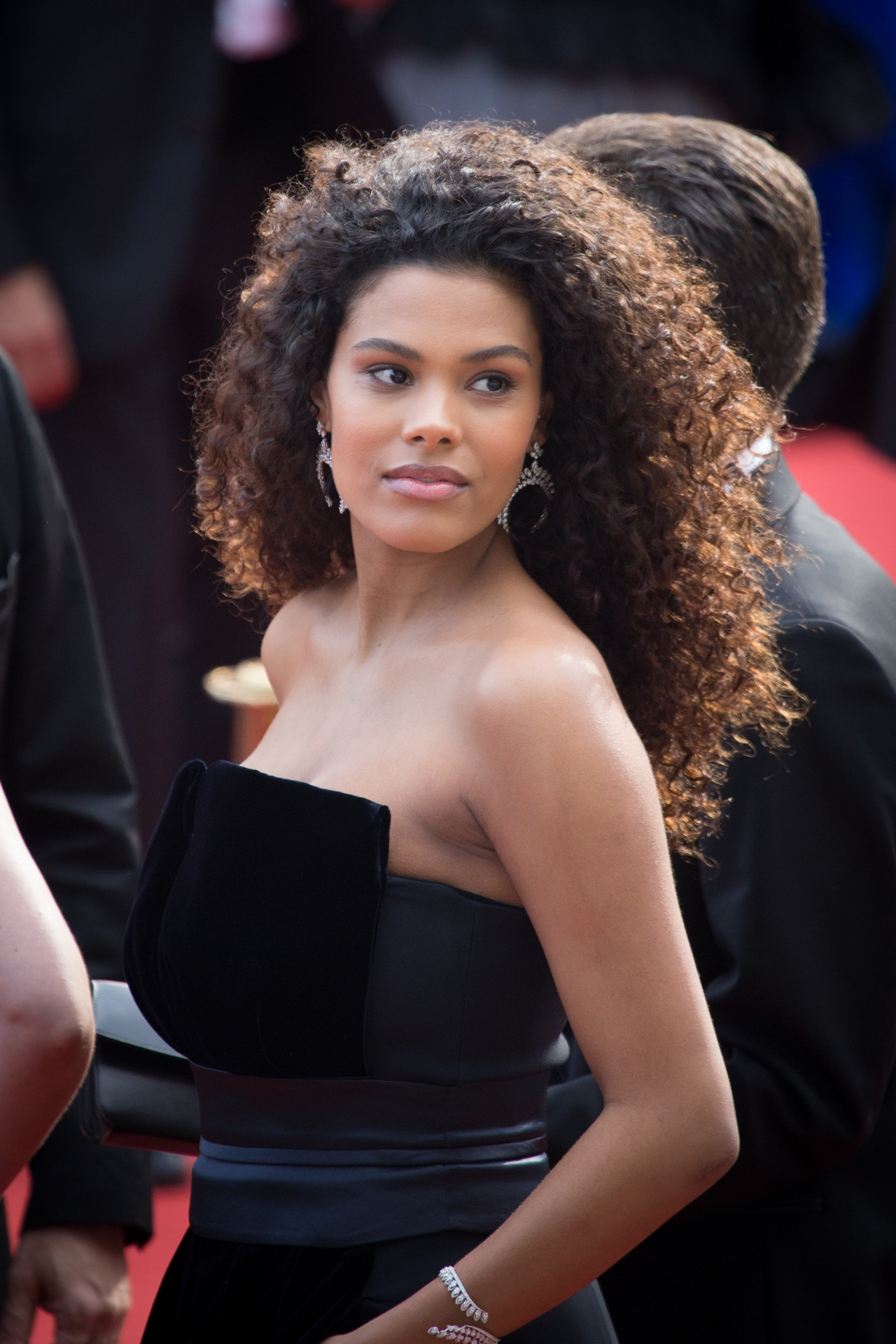
- Kunakey at the 2019 Cannes Film Festival
- Born: Tina Kunakey Di Vita; 5 April 1997 (age 29); Toulouse, France
- Occupations: Model; actress
- Spouse: Vincent Cassel (m. 2018; sep. 2023)
- Children: 1
- Modeling information
- Agency: Next Management (Paris); IMG Models (New York)

Tina Kunakey Di Vita (born 5 April 1997) is a French model and actress. She is known for her work with major fashion brands including Victoria's Secret, Jean Paul Gaultier, Dior, and The Kooples, and has appeared on the covers of Vogue, Harper's Bazaar, and Elle. Kunakey made her runway debut at Paris Fashion Week in January 2017.

== Early life ==
Kunakey was born in Toulouse, France. Her father, Robin Kunakey, is of Togolese origin and was born in Morocco, while her mother, Nadia Kunakey (née Di Vita), is from Sicily, Italy. She has a sister and a younger brother, Zakari Kunakey (born 2000), who is also a model.

The family settled in Biarritz on the Basque coast when Kunakey was young. She developed a passion for surfing, spending much of her childhood near the ocean. At age 15, she moved to Madrid to continue her studies and pursue modeling. Kunakey is fluent in French, Spanish, and English.

In an interview with Vogue Italia, Kunakey discussed her multicultural background, stating that having multiple origins provides "a much wider socio-cultural capital".

== Career ==
=== Modeling ===
Kunakey began her modeling career after being spotted by a surfwear company while surfing on a beach in Biarritz. Her first professional work was with surf and streetwear brands including Roxy, Billabong, and Quiksilver. After moving to Madrid, she signed with Mad Models Management in Barcelona, and later relocated to London where she joined SUPA Model Management.

Her breakthrough came in 2016 through appearances in music videos, including "Belinda" by French singer M. Pokora, which garnered over 12 million views on YouTube, and "Money Man" by A$AP Mob featuring A$AP Rocky.

On 25 January 2017, Kunakey made her runway debut at the Jean Paul Gaultier Haute Couture Spring/Summer 2017 show during Paris Fashion Week. That same year, she participated in Dior's campaign alongside Bella Hadid and was featured in L'Oréal's Colorista advertising campaign.

In 2018, Kunakey signed with IMG Models. She was named a brand ambassador for Volcom and appeared as a cover model for Etam. In May 2019, she launched the Tina Kunakey x Etam capsule collection, featuring prêt-à-porter and swimwear.

In February 2021, Kunakey and her then-husband Vincent Cassel were announced as brand ambassadors for French fashion house The Kooples. She designed a capsule collection titled "Tina for Vincent" with artistic director Tom Van Dorpe and also created "The Tina Bag". That same year, she was named an ambassador for Daniel Wellington's Quadro collection.

In 2023, Kunakey was named Global Ambassador for Superga for their Spring/Summer 2023 campaign. That same year, she served as co-creative director alongside Marcella Franklin on an inclusive swimwear capsule for Brazilian beachwear brand HAIGHT, designed to offer expanded sizing and adjustable styles.

In 2024, she appeared in the Victoria's Secret "Escape to Summer" campaign alongside Gigi Hadid, Emily Ratajkowski, and Paloma Elsesser, photographed by Mikael Jansson and styled by Emmanuelle Alt. She also fronted campaigns for Adanola and Amina Muaddi. In November 2024, Kunakey and her brother Zakari appeared together in the Sacai × Nike capsule campaign, photographed by Joshua Woods.

In 2025, Kunakey was the face of Frankies Bikinis' Spring 2025 "Beach Baby" campaign and starred in Amina Muaddi's first handbag campaign for the Cruise 2025 collection.

Kunakey has appeared on the covers of numerous international fashion magazines, including Vogue (France and Italy), Harper's Bazaar (Spain), Elle, Marie Claire (Italy), Grazia, L'Officiel, Madame Figaro, Vanity Fair (Italy), and 10 Magazine USA. She is currently represented by Next Management in Paris and IMG Models.

=== Acting ===
In 2018, Kunakey made her acting debut in the FX biographical crime drama series Trust, created by Simon Beaufoy and executive produced by Danny Boyle. The series depicted the 1973 kidnapping of John Paul Getty III. She appeared in three episodes as a bargirl.

== Personal life ==
Kunakey met French actor Vincent Cassel in the summer of 2015 in Biarritz. They publicly confirmed their relationship in November 2016 at a Victoria's Secret party. Their relationship attracted media attention due to their 31-year age difference.

The couple married on 24 August 2018 in a civil ceremony at the town hall in Bidart, France, near Biarritz, with approximately 100 guests in attendance. Kunakey wore a custom Vera Wang gown, featuring an ivory dress with a hand-draped French tulle bodice and a voluminous ball skirt.

Their daughter, Amazonie, was born on 19 April 2019 in Paris.

In April 2023, media outlets reported that Kunakey and Cassel had separated after nearly five years of marriage, following Cassel's deletion of photos of Kunakey from his social media accounts.

== Public appearances ==
Kunakey is a regular attendee at major film festivals, including the Cannes Film Festival (2018, 2019, 2021, 2022, 2023, 2024) and the Venice Film Festival (2019, 2022).

== Filmography ==
| Year | Title | Role | Notes |
|---|---|---|---|
| 2018 | Trust | Bargirl | FX series; 3 episodes |
