= Rockin' Squat =

French rapper, producer and director (born 1969)

- Also known as: Squat; Mathias Cassel; RCKNSQT
- Born: Mathias Crochon; 7 September 1969 (age 56)
- Origin: Paris, France
- Genres: Hip hop; Rap; French Rap; Political rap; Freestyle rap
- Occupations: Rapper; record producer; director
- Years active: 1985–present
- Label: Livin'Astro
- Formerly of: Assassin
- Website: http://www.livinastro5000.com/

Rockin' Squat (né Mathias Crochon (French: [matjas kʁɔʃɔ̃]); born 7 September 1969), also known as Mathias Cassel, is a French rapper, producer and director. He is the founder of Assassin, and co-founder of the Franco-Brazilian film festival Planeta Ginga. He has collaborated in music with artists like KRS-One, Seu Jorge, Tony Allen, Supernatural, Olodum, Ol Dirty Bastard, Cheick Tidiane Seck, El-P, RZA, Agallah, R.A. the Rugged Man, Immortal Technique, Oxmo Puccino, Mr. Catra or Wise Intelligent. He also collaborated with directors like Jean-François Richet, Olivier Megaton, Mathieu Kassovitz, and Jan Kounen, among others.

== Early life ==
Mathias Cassel (né Mathias Crochon) was born on 7 September 1970 in Paris, the son of actor Jean-Pierre Cassel and Sabine Cassel-Lanfranchi, former editor-in-chief of the gastronomic pages of American Elle. He comes from a family of artists: his brother is actor Vincent Cassel and his half-sister actress Cécile Cassel, also known as HollySiz as a singer. During his childhood, Mathias grew up in the United States, bathed in hip-hop culture, he began rap at the age of 11. Before his career as a rapper, he was a “tagger” known on the Parisian scene under the name of Squat and wrote texts at the same time.

In 1985, he founded Assassin with Solo. Assassin is one of the first groups to bring hip-hop to France, with “conscious” lyrics, delivering a political and social message. Like NTM or IAM, this group, considered to be a pioneer, has marked the history of French rap. It is also the first rap group to give a concert at the Olympia in 1993 and to have set up its own label, independent of the majors. From 1991 to 2004, the records of the group Assassin were self-produced and came out under the label Assassin Productions, the first independent label of French rap. From 2005, the albums were reissued under the new independent label, Livin' Astro, created in 2004 by Rockin' Squat, and under which, since, his solo albums have been released, each of them certified gold disc always meets a large audience, independently and without media support.

== Career ==
In the mid-1980s, he created the famous rap group Assassin, becoming the first artist of this scene to mention politics and social problems in his records. The subjects of his rap songs include modern slavery ("Esclave 2000"), ecology ("Sauvons la planète"), political prisoners ("Écrire contre l'oubli"), women's rights ("L'objet" and "L'Entrave a nos jouissances"), racism ("Peur d'une race"), the NWO ("Démocratie fasciste : Article 1, 2, 3 and 4", "Illuminazi 666") or African colonisation ("France à fric"). He worked with such artists as KRS-One, Olodum, Immortal Technique, Cheick Tidiane Seck, El-P, RZA, RA the Rugged Man, and Wise Intelligent. His triple album, "Confessions d'un enfant du siècle", has been released between 2008 and 2010.

== Collaborations ==
In April 2009, a new song leaked on the internet named Democratie Fasciste (Article 4) which featured Immortal Technique. The official release of the song and Rockin Squat's album "Confessions D'un Enfant Du Siècle Volume 2" was on May 12, 2009. The beat from the song was sampled from Wu-Tang Clan's song "Tearz". The song expresses the inequalities of the Third World and revolutionary events throughout history against tyranny and oppression. The song contains lyrics in English (Immortal Technique), French (Rockin' Squat) and brief shout outs in Spanish (Immortal Technique). He made tracks with, among others, KRS-One, Seu Jorge, Tony Allen, Olodum, Ol Dirty Bastard, Cheick Tidiane Seck, El-P, RZA, R.A. the Rugged Man, Oxmo Puccino, Wise Intelligent, and Suprême NTM.

== Discography ==
- From 1989 to 2002 - all the records of Assassin rap crew
- 2002 "Illegal Mixtape" (Street Album) (As.Prod)
- 2003 "Illegal Mixtape 2" (Street Album) (As.Prod / Livin' Astro)
- 2004 "Libre vs Démocratie fasciste" (EP) (Livin' Astro / Menace Records / M10)
- 2005 "Libre vs Démocratie fasciste" (Remix) (Livin' Astro / EMI)
- 2006 "Illegal Mixtape 2" (Reedition) (Livin'Astro)
- 2007 "Too Hot for TV" (EP) (Livin'Astro)
- 2008 "Confessions d'un enfant du siècle" (Volume 1) (Livin' Astro)
- 2009 "Confessions d'un enfant du siècle" (Volume 2) (Livin' Astro)
- 2010 "Olympia 2009" (Livin'Astro)
- 2010 "Confessions d'un enfant du siècle" (Volume 3) (Livin' Astro)
- 2011 "US Alien Chapter one" (Compilation) (Livin' Astro)
- 2011 "Confessions / La Trilogie" (Livin'Astro)
- 2011 "Illegal Mixtapes 1 (Réédition 2011)" (Livin'Astro)
- 2012 "Illegal Mixtapes 3" (Livin'Astro)

== DVD ==
- 2010 Assassin/Rockin' Squat "Olympia 2009" 2h20 Live show at Olympia, Paris, France
