= Harry Tschopik Jr. =

Harry Tschopik Jr. (August 23, 1915 – November 12, 1956) was an American ethnologist whose research centered on South American material culture, namely Peruvian indigenous communities. He worked to fuse a relationship between ethnology and archeology, while adhering strongly to a belief in the mission of museums to take anthropology to the public. He was a seminal figure in Peruvian ethnology having trained many of the first-generation Peruvian ethnologists, and as a scholar, he set the standard for field recordings for cultural anthropology.

== Early life and education ==
Born in New Orleans on August 23, 1915, Tschopik, Jr. was named for his father, Harry Schlessinger Tschopik. While attending Isidore Newman High School in New Orleans, he became interested initially in the field of archeology, then decided to pursue a career in anthropology.

Tschopik enrolled at Tulane University in the fall of 1932, after being declined admission to the University of California at Berkeley. After completing his first two years of collegiate general studies at Tulane, he transferred to the University of California his junior year, where he completed his A.B. in anthropology with honors in 1936. Shortly before his graduation from the University of California, he landed his first field experience opportunity in the summer of 1935 as a member of the archeological field crew working under Waldo R. Wedel in the Sacramento Valley near Marysville.

Tschopik continued his education at Harvard University, doing graduate work on a path that would allow him to specialize in the archeology of Central America. When opportunities to work within his specialty failed to materialize, he instead accepted the invitation to assist Clyde Kluckhohn in his ethnographic work on the material culture of Navaho communities throughout 1937.

== Career ==
Tschopik's career in ethnology began alongside his work with Kluckhohn. While his original trajectory was toward archeology, his admiration for Kluckhohn's work and guidance helped convert him to ethnology. Much of his early scholarship is centered on his field of the Navaho communities from 1937 to 1941.

His interest in Peruvian cultures stemmed from his work with Marion Hutchinson, whom he would marry in August 1939. Alongside Hutchinson, he initially studied a mummy bundle discovered in the Great Necropolis at Paracas, Peru. Upon completion of his M.A. at Harvard, he and Hutchinson relocated to Peru to perform fieldwork on the conservative Aymará community outside of Puno. Much of Tschopik Jr.'s career was centered on his fieldwork of material culture of the Aymará people, including his dissertation for a Ph.D. from Harvard University in 1951.

In 1945, Tschopik replaced John Gillin as the Representative in Peru for the Institute of Social Anthropology within the Smithsonian Institution. By 1947, he became the Assistant Curator of Ethnology at the American Institute of Natural History in New York City. From 1949 to 1951, he held a brief appointment as Lecturer at Columbia University, where he taught courses on Andean communities. While he was revered by his colleagues and students as a great teacher, Tschopik preferred the hands-on work of ethnology and anthropology, as well as the collaborations with museums and other institutions.

Beyond his work with the Aymará people, Tschopik documented numerous communities throughout Eastern Peru, including the Campa people, Conibo, Cocama people, Shipibo, and Ucayali peoples. In 1951, he developed an installation at the American Museum based on his work, entitled "Men of the Montaña". He made a 1953 trip to document the Shipibo-Conibo people in Peru, and recorded silent footage of the tribe. In a 2016 article, researchers at The Field Museum described Tschopik's film as "the earliest and most substantial visual documentation of the Shipibo-Conibo culture" and described it as an inspiration for a documentary film, Shipibo: La Película de Nuestra Memoria.

On November 12, 1956, Tschopik died in his sleep because of heart failure. At the time of his death, he was developing long-term research plans for ongoing research of the Shipibo and Ucayali peoples. He was survived by his wife Marion, a son, and two daughters.

== Works ==
- Tschopik, Harry. "Taboo as a possible factor involved in the obsolescence of Navaho pottery and basketry." American Anthropologist. 40 (1938): pp. 257–262.
- ——. "Artifacts of perishable materials." The University of New Mexico Bulletin: Anthropological Series. Volume 3, No. 2 (1939): pp. 94–130.
- ——. "Navaho basketry: a study of culture change." American Anthropologist. 42 (1940): pp. 444–462.
- ——. "Navaho pottery making: an inquiry into the affinities of Navaho painted pottery." Papers of Peabody Museum of American Archeology and Ethnology. Harvard University. Volume 18, No 1 (1941).
- ——. "The Aymará." Handbook of South American Indians. Bureau of American Ethnology Bulletin. Volume 2 (1946): pp. 501–573.
- ——. "Highland communities of central Peru: a regional survey." Institute of Social Anthropology. Number 5. Washington, D.C.: Smithsonian Institution, 1947.
- ——. "Program Notes and Bibliography." Music of Peru. N. P.: Folkways Records, 1950.
- ——. "Men of Montaña." Natural History. (December, 1951): pp. 450–455.
- ——. "Program Notes." Maori Songs of New Zealand. N. P.: Folkways Records, 1952.
