= Blueberry (film) =

2004 film

- Directed by: Jan Kounen
- Written by: Gerard Brach; Matt Alexander; Jan Kounen
- Starring: Vincent Cassel; Juliette Lewis; Michael Madsen; Djimon Hounsou; Eddie Izzard
- Cinematography: Tetsuo Nagata
- Edited by: Jennifer Augé; Bénédicte Brunet; Joël Jacovella
- Music by: Jean-Jacques Hertz; François Roy
- Distributed by: UGC Fox Distribution
- Release date: 11 February 2004
- Running time: 124 minutes
- Countries: France; Mexico; United Kingdom
- Languages: English; German; French; Spanish
- Budget: €34.5 million
- Box office: $5.7 million

Blueberry (French: Blueberry : L'expérience secrète), released in some regions as Renegade, is a 2004 French acid Western directed by Jan Kounen. It is an adaptation of the Franco-Belgian comic book series Blueberry, illustrated by Jean Giraud (better known as Moebius) and scripted by Jean-Michel Charlier, but the film has little in common with the source material. The film stars Vincent Cassel as the title character along with Michael Madsen, Juliette Lewis, Djimon Hounsou, Eddie Izzard, Temuera Morrison, Tchéky Karyo, Kestenbetsa, and Ernest Borgnine. Although the film is a French production, the film is in English to match the story's setting in America's Wild West in the 1870s. Since the character of Blueberry remains obscure in the States, the film was released on DVD in America in November 2004 under the title Renegade and marketed very much as a conventional Western.

== Plot ==
U.S. Marshal Mike Donovan (Vincent Cassel) (referred to as Broken Nose by the aboriginal tribe; unlike the comic his nickname is not Blueberry) has dark memories of the death of his first love. He keeps peace between the white settlers and the Native Americans who had temporarily adopted and taken care of him. The evil actions of Blount, a "white sorcerer" lead him to confront the villain in the Sacred Mountains, and, through shamanic rites involving an entheogenic brew, conquer his fears and uncover a suppressed memory he would much rather deny.

== Cast ==
- Vincent Cassel as Mike Blueberry
  - Hugh O'Conor as Young Mike Blueberry
- Juliette Lewis as Maria Sullivan
- Michael Madsen as Wallace Sebastian Blount
- Temuera Morrison as Runi
- Ernest Borgnine as Rolling Star
- Djimon Hounsou as Woodhead
- Geoffrey Lewis as Greg Sullivan
- Nichole Hiltz as Lola
- Kateri Walker as Kateri
- Vahina Giocante as Madeleine
- Kestenbetsa as Kheetseen
- Tchéky Karyo as Uncle
- Eddie Izzard as Prosit
- Colm Meaney as Jimmy
- François Levantal as Pete

== Production ==
Jean Giraud, the famous Franco-Belgian comics creator and the illustrator of the original Blueberry comics, appears in a cameo role in the film, while Geoffrey Lewis, who had appeared in several spaghetti Westerns, and his daughter Juliette Lewis play a father and daughter in the movie.

The movie features several elaborate psychedelic 3D computer graphics sequences as a means of portraying Blueberry's shamanic experiences from his point of view. Jan Kounen, the director of the film, drew upon his extensive firsthand knowledge of ayahuasca rituals in order to design the visuals for these sequences, Kounen having undergone the ceremony at least a hundred times with Shipibo language speakers in Peru. An authentic Shipibo ayahuasca guide appears in the film and performs a sacred chant. In the film, the exact nature of the entheogenic sacramental liquid which Blueberry (and his enemy, Blount) drink remains undisclosed. During the final visionary scene, however, there is a bowl of leaves shown accompanied by a twisting vine which is probably the ayahuasca vine, Banisteriopsis caapi. Historically, Native Americans living in the Southwest United States, would have had no geographic access to ayahuasca.

Peyote is shown growing in the sacred areas throughout the film, and the buttons are prominently displayed at the end, although the viewer cannot be sure what Runi offers to the Marshal either time.

== Reception ==
Blueberry was not a critical success in the Anglophone world and received mostly negative reviews. On Rotten Tomatoes it has a 22% rating based on reviews from 9 critics.

Jamie Russell, of the BBC, felt the film was 'two parts bonkers to one part boring', and compared it to The Missing by describing it as 'totally lost'. In his review for Cinopsis, Eric Van Cutsem found that the film greatly disappointed the expectations of the large audiences of the original comic, being largely unrelated in both story and character. Raphaël Jullien, of Abus de Cine, felt the film's greatest weakness was that it was partly auteur experimentalism and partly genre western.

Some reviewers found praise for Blueberry. Lisa Nesselson, writing for Variety was generally positive, noting the film demonstrated "one of the most mystical approaches to the Western this side of El Topo and felt that the hallucinogenic climax of the film 'may be the closest this generation will get to having its own variation on the Stargate sequence in Kubrick's 2001: A Space Odyssey". Nesselson also noted that the film 'functions better as a purely visual journey than as the revelatory spiritual crucible it aspires to be'.

Blueberry has managed to build a reputation as a cult success and as a trip film. French language cult cinema website Film de Culte awarded the film 5-out-of-6, noting the unusual goal of the antagonist, 'the treasure sought by Wally Blount is not gold hidden in Indian mountains, but the spirit that emerges' through the quest of the protagonist as 'a man in search of his identity, his roots, openness to the world and, why not, to love'. The cinematography by Tetsuo Nagata was also referred to as 'sublime'. Tripzine noted the film has 'the best, most accurate, most lovingly crafted shamanic rituals and psychedelic visuals ever created for home viewing', and praised Blueberry's uniqueness among westerns for having a climax that revolved around shamanic rite rather than a gun battle.

== See also ==
- List of films featuring hallucinogens
- List of films based on French-language comics
