= Guillermo Arévalo =

Shipibo shaman in Peru (born 1952)

Guillermo Arévalo Valera
- Kestenbetsa
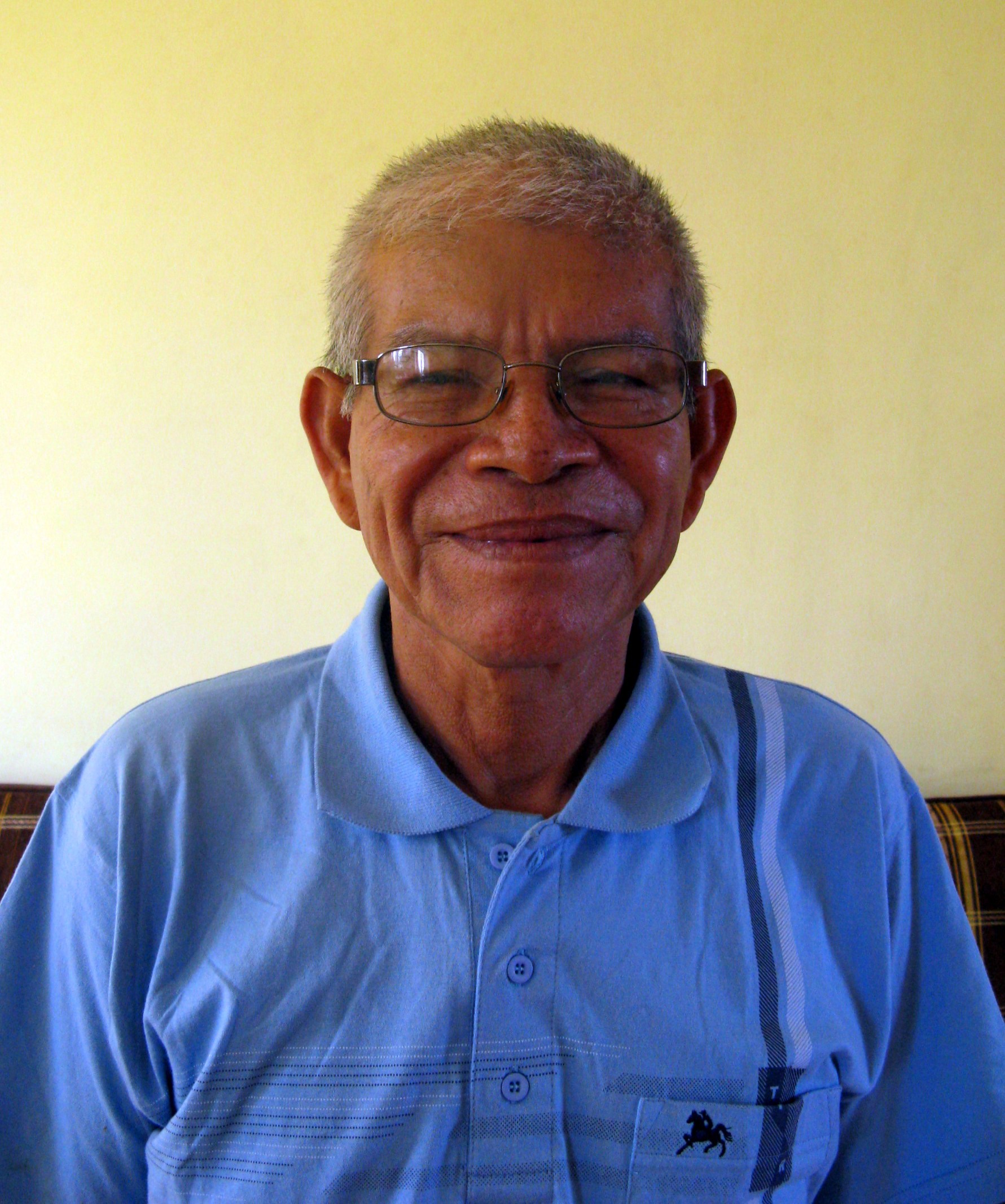
- Arévalo in 2010
- Born: 1952 (age 73–74); Yarinacocha, Ucayali Region, Peru
- Occupations: Businessperson, vegetalista
- Known for: AMETRA
- Notable work: Las plantas medicinales y su beneficio en la salud Shipibo-Conibo (1994)

Guillermo Arévalo Valera (born 1952) is a Shipibo vegetalista and businessperson from the Maynas Province of Peru. His Shipibo name is Kestenbetsa.

In 1982, Arévalo co-founded Aplicación de Medicina Tradicional (AMETRA), an organization that sought to improve the sustainability of health care for the Shipibo-Conibo people by integrating traditional plant medicines. He is also the owner of Anaconda Cosmica, a retreat lodge in Peruvian Amazonia. The lodge is marketed to health tourists who are interested in ayahuasca and other traditional medicines of the Amazon.

Among his several children is James Arévalo (b. 1972), a vegetalista whose Shipibo name is Panshincopi.

== Training and background ==
Guillermo Arévalo Valera was born in 1952 in Yarinacocha, a Shipibo community near Lake Yarinaqucha, on the outskirts of Pucallpa. He is the son of Benito Arévalo Barbarán and María Valera Teco. At age seven, he was matriculated into a Catholic mission school near Puerto Inca, a village on the bank of the Pachitea River. This was a boarding school, and Guillermo lived there until he was 18. When this phase of his education was complete, his parents pressed him to go to Brazil to study nursing. However, he cut his nursing studies short and returned to Yarinacocha, where he accepted a position as a nurse at the Hospital Amazónico.

=== From the hospital to the rainforest ===
His experience at the hospital was formative. He worked with patients who were recovering from surgery; some of them told him that the hospital's treatments didn't make them feel better, even if examinations and test results indicated improvement. Others worried that Western medicine couldn't help them if their illness was a result of witchcraft (brujería). Through observations and conversations with patients and hospital staff—especially a Swedish doctor named Anders Hansson—he concluded that Western medicine did not meet all the needs of the indigenous population. But the limits to the hospital's efficacy were not just a matter of cultural difference: The indigenous population was contending with serious health problems and constrained medical resources.

Arévalo looked to Shipibo traditional medicine as an alternative, researching phytotherapy and local plant lore. By age 22 he was learning about the Amazonian shamanic discipline of vegetalismo, and eventually saw a need to undergo the customary training rites. His father was a vegetalista, but Arévalo traveled downriver to the village of Pahoyan to be mentored by Manuel Mahua (1930–2008). He was about age 24 when he resigned from the hospital and committed himself to three months of isolation and self-deprivation in the forest—a shamanic practice known as dieta. By age 26, he was practicing vegetalismo.

== AMETRA ==
In 1982, Arévalo and Anders Hansson co-founded a local organization called Aplicación de Medicina Tradicional (AMETRA), which (with Swedish funding) sought to revive the traditional medicine practices of Shipibo-Conibo people, and to look for ways to incorporate them into a health system for indigenous communities. Over the next few years, AMETRA published several papers, and Arévalo and Hansson personally authored or contributed to some of these.

The practicality of an integrative medicine approach attracted the attention of two regional federations of indigenous peoples: FECONAU (Federacíon de Comunidades Nativas del Ucayali y Afluentes) and FENAMAD (Federación Nativa del Río Madre de Dios y Afluentes), who sought to apply AMETRA's ideas to a revised health system in their own regions. As AMETRA's concept began to coalesce into possible solutions, funding flowed in from the World Wide Fund for Nature, the Rainforest Alliance, Pronaturaleza, and various member organizations of Friends of the Earth.

Arévalo left AMETRA in 1990 over contrasting views within the organization.

== Later advocacy and entrepreneurship ==
After leaving AMETRA, Arévalo began treating people at his home in Yarinacocha, catering exclusively to a mestizo clientele. In 1994, through his affiliation with the indigenous development organization AIDESEP, he published a book: Medicinal Plants and Their Benefit to Shipibo-Conibo Health (Spanish: Las plantas medicinales y su beneficio en la salud Shipibo-Conibo).

In May 1999, the UN's World Intellectual Property Organization (WIPO) met with Arévalo to discuss his perspective on the "intellectual property needs and expectations" of Amazonian peoples. Arévalo expressed the view that traditional medicine is of pivotal importance to Amazonian cultures, and that indigenous communities must be able to negotiate access to it in order to prevent exploitation and environmental harm. Arévalo was one of several people that WIPO representatives spoke with during a fact-finding mission to Peru and Bolivia. Arévalo spoke in his capacity as president of IDIMA, the Instituto de Difusion e Investigacion de la Medicina Amazonica.

In 2004, Arévalo founded a woodland healing-retreat near the city of Iquitos. He co-managed the center with his wife, Sonia Chuquimbalqui, and marketed it to health tourists. The center was called Espíritu de Anaconda ("Anaconda Spirit") until they renamed it to Anaconda Cosmica ("Cosmic Anaconda") in 2011. For a time, Arévalo also operated a second lodge, Baris Betsa.

Arévalo's son James began operating a retreat lodge called Luz Cosmica in 2010. James learned vegetalismo from his grandfather, Benito; he began studying under Guillermo in 2006. Another of Arévalo's students, Ricardo Amaringo, opened a lodge called Nihue Rao (a.k.a. Ronin Saini) in 2011, in partnership with American family medicine practitioner Joe Tafur and Canadian artist Cvita Mamic.

A central fixture at the retreat lodges is the administration of ayahuasca, a psychedelic tisane used and revered by ethnic groups throughout the Amazon Basin. In an interview with journalist Roger Rumrrill in 2005, Arévalo lamented the state of drug tourism in Peru.

== Recorded media ==
Arévalo was filmed for the ayahuasca documentary films D'autres mondes (2004) and Vine of the Soul: Encounters with Ayahuasca (2010). Jan Kounen, director of D'autres mondes, met Arévalo in the Peruvian Amazon while conducting research for his film Blueberry (2004). Kounen gave Arévalo a minor role in Blueberry, and participated in ayahuasca ceremonies with him over the course of a year. Two songs sung by Arévalo (credited to his Shipibo name, Kestenbetsa) appear on the Blueberry soundtrack. When another interviewer asked Arévalo what impact his appearances in Kounen's films have had, Arévalo said: "It meant that more and more people became aware of ayahuasca shamanism, and that's good. Professionally it's meant that more and more people are interested in Guillermo, and they want to know me."

Kounen had previously co-produced an album of eight songs sung by Arévalo (a cappella) in the Shipibo language. The album, Songs from Questembetsa: Shipibo Shaman of Peru, was released on CD in 2000. The other co-producers were French musicians Jean-Jacques Hertz and François Roy, who also composed Blueberry's score.

== Controversy ==
Guillermo has been accused, but never demonstrated or judged, of abusing his power and sexually abusing a female student under the influence of ayahuasca. According to the woman, Guillermo "put his hands down my pants. And there's this sense of feeling frozen. I lay there in fear and then he put his hands up my shirt and felt around my breasts."

== See also ==
- Pablo Amaringo
- Manuel Córdova-Rios
- Jeremy Narby
- Indigenous land rights
