= Dobermann (film) =

- Directed by: Jan Kounen
- Written by: Joël Houssin
- Produced by: Frédérique Dumas; Éric Névé
- Starring: Tchéky Karyo; Vincent Cassel; Monica Bellucci
- Cinematography: Michel Amathieu
- Edited by: Bénédicte Brunet
- Music by: Brune; Jean-Jacques Hertz; Philippe Mallier; François Roy; Schyzomaniac
- Distributed by: PolyGram Film Distribution
- Release date: 18 June 1997 (France)
- Running time: 103 mins.
- Country: France
- Languages: French, English
- Budget: $5 million
- Box office: $5.9 million

Dobermann is a 1997 French crime action film directed by Jan Kounen starring Tchéky Karyo, Vincent Cassel, and Monica Bellucci. It is based on a series of police novels by Joël Houssin.

== Plot ==
The charismatic criminal Dobermann (Vincent Cassel), who got his first gun when he was christened, leads a gang of brutal robbers with his beautiful, deaf girlfriend Nat the Gypsy (Monica Bellucci). After a complex and violent bank robbery, they are hunted by the Paris police, led by the sadistic cop Christini (Tchéky Karyo), who wants to catch Dobermann at any cost. He manages to catch another gang member Olivier, who is also a transvestite going by the name of Sonia. Christini threatens to kill Olivier's baby, if he does not help him catch the gang. Olivier has no choice and visits a disco where the other gang members are celebrating their robbery. With an alarm transmitter, he tells Christini where all the gang members are and the police start a raid.

After a gun fight the police arrest several members of the gang but some manage to escape, including Dobermann. He flees into a hidden basement, which also has monitoring screens showing what is happening in the various rooms of the disco.

Christini kills one of the gang members and abducts Nat in a car, intending to rape her. Dobermann leaves his hiding place and follows in a stolen ambulance, overtaking Christini and managing to wrestle him down in the car. Dobermann grinds the head of Christini on the road while still driving the car at high speed as revenge for the killed friends, leaving him lying in the road, presumably dead.

The surviving gang members are able to escape and bury Sonia (in her female guise), suggesting that her treason means that Olivier will have to drop his transvestite role. As they leave the scene in their convertible, a police helicopter is shown following them, with their car in its sights.

== Cast ==
- Tchéky Karyo as Christini
- Vincent Cassel as Yann Lepentrec "Dobermann"
- Monica Bellucci as Nat the Gypsy
- Antoine Basler as Jean-Claude Ayache "Moustique"
- Dominique Bettenfeld as Elie Frossard dit l'Abbé
- Marc Duret as Inspecteur Baumann
- Florence Thomassin as Florence
- Romain Duris as Manu
- François Levantal as Léo

== Possible sequel ==
On 24 May 2011 a sequel called Dobermann 2: Arm Wrestle was announced, with a $35 million budget and Vincent Cassel in talks to reprise the role of Dobermann. This didn't materialise however.
