= Jean-Pierre Cassel =

French actor and dancer (1932–2007)

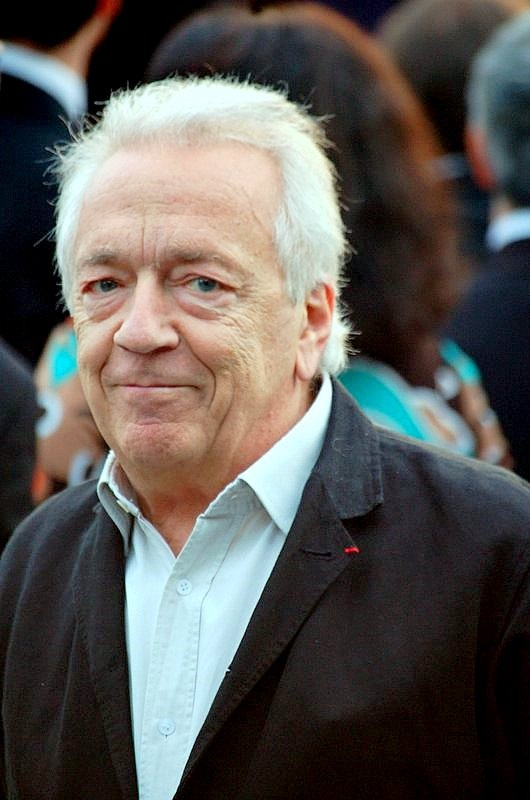
- Jean-Pierre Cassel at the 2006 Cannes Film Festival.
- Born: Jean-Pierre Crochon; 27 October 1932; Paris, France
- Died: 19 April 2007 (aged 74); Paris, France
- Occupations: Actor; dancer
- Spouses: Sabine Litique (m. 1966; div. 1980) Anne Célérier (m. 1981)
- Children: 4, including Vincent, Mathias and Cécile
- Relatives: Deva Cassel (granddaughter)

Jean-Pierre Cassel (French pronunciation: [ʒɑ̃ pjɛʁ ka'sɛl]; born Jean-Pierre Crochon; 27 October 1932 – 19 April 2007) was a French actor and dancer. A popular star of French cinema, he was initially known for his comedy film appearances, though he also proved a gifted dramatic actor, and accrued over 200 film and television credits in a career spanning over 50 years.

He worked with many notable directors, including Jean-Pierre Melville, Luis Buñuel, Abel Gance, Jean Renoir, Claude Chabrol, Sidney Lumet, Joseph Losey, Chantal Akerman and Robert Altman. He was nominated for a César Award for Best Supporting Actor for his performance in La Cérémonie (1995).

Cassel was also the father of actor Vincent Cassel, actress/singer Cécile Cassel, and rapper Mathias Cassel.

== Early life ==
Cassel was born Jean-Pierre Crochon in the 13th arrondissement of Paris, the son of Louise-Marguerite (née Fabrègue), an opera singer, and Georges Crochon, a doctor. Cassel was discovered by Gene Kelly as he tap danced on stage, and later cast in the 1957 film The Happy Road.

== Career ==
Cassel gained prominence in the late 1950s as a hero in comedies by Philippe de Broca such as Male Companion and through his role as 'Jean François Jardie' in the famous French resistance piece L' Armée des ombres.

During the 1960s and 1970s, he worked with Claude Chabrol (The Breach), Luis Buñuel (as Stéphane Audran's husband in The Discreet Charm of the Bourgeoisie 1972), Ken Annakin (as the Frenchman in Those Magnificent Men in Their Flying Machines 1965), Gérard Brach (as Claude Jade's lover in The Boat on the Grass), Richard Lester (as Louis XIII in The Three Musketeers 1973 and its sequel The Four Musketeers 1974), Sidney Lumet (as Pierre in Murder on the Orient Express) and Joseph Losey (with Isabelle Huppert in The Trout). He also made an appearance in Oh! What a Lovely War as a French military officer singing 'Belgium put the Kibosh on the Kaiser'. In later years, he appeared in Robert Altman's Prêt-à-Porter (1994) and also as Dr. Paul Gachet for Vincent & Theo (1990).

In 2006, at the age of 74, he returned to the stage for a retrospective of Serge Gainsbourg, Jean-Pierre Cassel chante et danse Gainsbourg Suite. This homage to an old friend (he knew Gainsbourg in the 1950s) featured various songs of the French composer among which three unpublished songs named "Top à Cassel" – "Cliquediclac", "Ouh ! Là là là là", and "Viva la pizza" – all of which were intended for a television show aired in 1964.

In 2007, Cassel appeared in dual roles (as Père Lucien and the Lourdes souvenir vendor) in Julian Schnabel's film The Diving Bell and the Butterfly.

During his career, Cassel starred in more than 110 films, fifty stage plays, and many musical theatre performances and television shows.

== Personal life ==
Cassel was the father of Vincent Cassel, Mathias Cassel (also known as Rockin' Squat, leader of the French rap crew Assassin), and Cécile Cassel. He was "very close" to his children and his daughter-in-law, Monica Bellucci.

== Death ==
On 19 April 2007, Cassel died of cancer aged 74.

== Selected filmography ==
Year	Title	Role	Notes
1953	Act of Love	Un danseur	Uncredited
1957	The Happy Road	Young lover at the Guinguette	Uncredited
1957	On Foot, on Horse, and on Wheels	Mariel	
1958	Le désordre et la nuit	Un jeune militaire	Uncredited
1958	In Case of Adversity	Le trompettiste	Uncredited
1958	And Your Sister?		Uncredited
1960	The Love Game	Victor	
1960	The Joker	Édouard Berlon	
1960	Candide ou l'optimisme au XXe siècle	Candide	
1961	Five Day Lover	Antoine	
1961	Goodbye Again	Dancer	Uncredited cameo
1961	Napoleon II, the Eagle	Gustav von Neipperg	
1962	The Dance	Albert	
1962	The Seven Deadly Sins	Raymond	"Avarice, L" segment
1962	The Elusive Corporal	Le caporal/The Corporal	
1962	Arsène Lupin Versus Arsène Lupin	Gérard Dagmar	
1964	High Infidelity	Tonino	"La Sospirosa" segment
1964	Les plus belles escroqueries du monde	Alain des Arcys	"L'homme qui vendit la Tour Eiffel" segment
1964	Cyrano et d'Artagnan	Monsieur d'Artagnan, de la Compagnie des Mousquetaires du Roy	
1964	Male Companion	Antoine Mirliflor	
1965	Nunca pasa nada	Juan	
1965	Those Magnificent Men in Their Flying Machines	Pierre Dubois	
1965	The Lace Wars	Jolicoeur	
1966	Is Paris Burning?	Lieutenant Henri Karcher	
1967	The Killing Game	Pierre Meyrand	
1967	Anyone Can Play	Aldo	
1969	Oh! What a Lovely War	French Colonel	
1969	Army of Shadows	Jean François Jardie	
1970	L'Ours et la Poupée	Gaspard	
1970	The Breach	Paul Thomas	
1971	The Boat on the Grass	David	
1971	Malpertuis	Lampernisse	
1972	The Discreet Charm of the Bourgeoisie	Henri Sénéchal	
1973	Il magnate	Gianni	
1973	Baxter!	Roger Tunnell	
1973	The Three Musketeers	King Louis XIII	
1974	The Four Musketeers	King Louis XIII	
1974	Le Mouton enragé	Claude Fabre	
1974	Murder on the Orient Express	Pierre	
1975	That Lucky Touch	Leo	
1976	Docteur Françoise Gailland	Daniel Letessier	
1976	Scrambled Eggs	Le représentant du dirigeant italien	
1976	The Twist	Jacques Lavolet	
1978	Who Is Killing the Great Chefs of Europe?	Kohner	
1978	Les Rendez-vous d'Anna	Daniel	
1979	From Hell to Victory	Dick Sanders	
1980	Superman II	French Officer at the White House	Uncredited cameo
1981	Portrait of a Woman, Nude	Pierre	
1982	Alice	Rabbit	
1982	The Trout	Rambert	
1982	Ehrengard	Cazotte	
1985	Tranches de vie	Le comte de Forcheville	
1987	Vado a riprendermi il gatto		
1988	Chouans!	Baron de Tiffauges	
1988	Young Toscanini	Comparsa	Uncredited
1989	The Return of the Musketeers	Cyrano de Bergerac	
1990	Mister Frost	Inspector Corelli	
1990	Vincent & Theo	Dr. Paul Gachet	
1991	The Favour, the Watch and the Very Big Fish	Zalman	
1992	Between Heaven and Earth	Le rédacteur en chef	
1992	Amor e Dedinhos de Pé	Gonçalo Botelho	
1993	Métisse	Gynecologist	
1994	Hell	M. Vernon	
1994	Prêt-à-Porter	Olivier de la Fontaine	
1995	La Cérémonie	Georges Lelievre	
1998	The Ice Rink	Ice Rink's Manager	
2000	Sade	Le vicomte de Lancris	
2000	The Crimson Rivers	Dr. Bernard Chernezé	
2003	The Wooden Camera	Mr.	
2003	Michel Vaillant	Henri Vaillant	
2004	Narco	Le père de Gus	
2006	Congorama	Hervé Roy	
2007	Contre-enquête	Le docteur Delmas	
2007	The Diving Bell and the Butterfly	Père Lucien et le Vendeur	
2007	Vous êtes de la police ?	Simon Sablonnet	
2008	Asterix at the Olympic Games	Panoramix	

== Television ==
Year	Title	Role	Notes
1956	La Famille Anodin	Jean Lou Anodin	
1980	Love in a Cold Climate	Fabrice	3 episodes
1990	The Maid	C.P. Oliver	TV movie
1995	Tatort	Bruno Dupeyron	Episode: "Camerone"
