= Santa Clara de Uchunya v. Plantaciones de Pucallpa and the Regional Government of Ucayali =

1975 legal case in Peru

The Shipibo-Conibo indigenous community of Santa Clara de Uchunya is located in Nueva Requena District within the Ucayali region of Peru. In 1975, the Peruvian state formally recognized Santa Clara de Uchunya as a native community. The government then granted collective title to 218 hectares of the community's original territory, covering approximately 86,713 hectares. This title recognized the community's ownership of the portion of their territory where most of the community's permanent houses and crops were located. The community applied for extensions of the land title for its ancestral territory, but the Regional Agrarian Directorate of Ucayali did not process the request until 2015.

Between 2008 and 2009, the Regional Agrarian Directorate of Ucayali granted certificates of possession to settlers over small tracts of primary forest within the ancestral territory of Santa Clara de Uchunya. In 2012, the palm oil company Plantaciones de Pucallpa S.A.C. signed purchase and sale contracts with settlers to acquire land for palm oil production. The operations of Plantaciones de Pucallpa S.A.C led to the deforestation of nearly 7,000 hectares of ancestral land.

== Ucayali court ==
=== Filing and arguments ===
On May 26, 2016, the community filed a claim for protection in a constitutional lawsuit against the Regional Agrarian Directorate of Ucayali and Plantaciones de Pucallpa S.A.C for violating fundamental rights.

In the complaint the community challenged the constitutionality of the Regional Agrarian Directorate of Ucayali's issuance of 222 land titles to settlers within the ancestral lands of the community. They argued that the sale of indigenous land violated the fundamental right of indigenous peoples to communal property and possession of their ancestral territory under articles 13 and 14 of the ILO Convention 169 and article 88 of the Constitution of Peru.

Further, the community argued that the deforestation of 6,824 hectares of their ancestral land violated their fundamental right to enjoy an adequate and balanced environment under article 7.4 of the ILO Convention 169 and article 2.22 of the Constitution of Peru. Other fundamental rights named include the right of indigenous peoples to cultural identity and self-determination.

The community asked the court to declare the issuance of the 222 titles unconstitutional, and to order the Regional Agrarian Directorate of Ucayali to recognize the community's application to extend formal title to their territory. Additionally, the community asked the court to order company Plantaciones de Pucallpa S.A.C to stop the destruction of their lands and to restore the environment.

=== Lower court history ===
The case was first heard by the Mixed Court of Justice of Campo Verde in 2016 and then the Specialized Civil Chamber of the Superior Court of Justice of Ucayali in 2017. The Mixed Court declared the case inadmissible, reasoning that first, other avenues such as the judicial review of the administrative procedures of the Regional Agrarian Directorate of Ucayali and second, the time to bring a constitutional claim had passed. The Superior Court affirmed the first reason. The community then appealed its case to the highest court in Peru for constitutional matters, the Constitutional Tribunal.

== Constitutional Tribunal consideration ==
In August 2018 the Constitutional Tribunal admitted the community's claim for protection. On September 25, 2019 members of the Santa Clara de Uchunya community, including leader Carlos Hoyos and the president of the Federation of Native Communities of Ucayali (FECONAU) Miguel Guimareas attended a hearing with the magistrates of the Constitutional Tribunal. On January 25, 2022, the Constitutional Tribunal issued a decision declaring the claim for protection inadmissible. The Constitutional Tribunal urged the Regional Agrarian Directorate of Ucayali to proceed with the process of titling community land.

=== Amicus curiae briefs ===
The United Nations Special Rapporteur on the Rights of Indigenous Peoples, then Victoria Tauli-Corpuz, submitted an amicus brief in support of Santa Clara de Uchunya that highlighted Peru's international human rights obligations. The Global Justice Clinic of the New York University School of Law alongside the Forest Peoples Programme also submitted an amicus curiae brief in support of the community.

== Subsequent history ==
Since 2016, the palm oil company Ocho Sur continues to operate in the region after purchasing the property from Plantaciones de Pucallpa S.A.C.

In 2022, the community of Santa Clara de Uchunya formally registered title to 1,544 hectares of their territory.
