= Jan Kounen =

Dutch-French film director and film producer (born 1964)

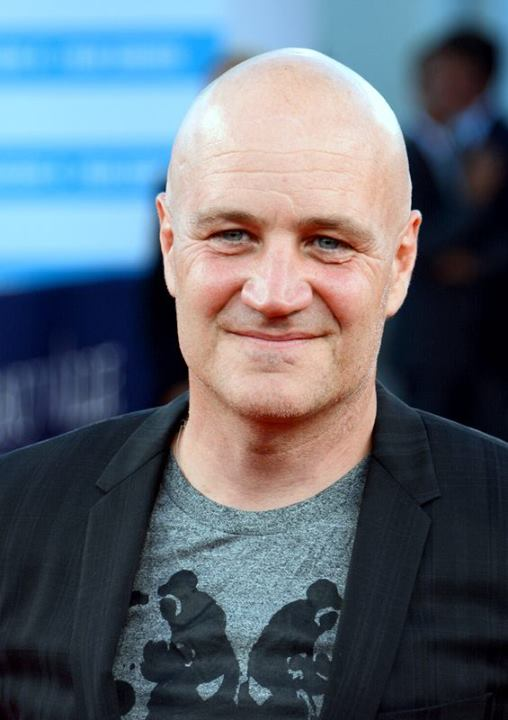
- Kounen in 2013
- Born: Jan Coenen; 2 May 1964 (age 61); Utrecht, Netherlands
- Citizenship: France; Netherlands
- Occupations: Film director, film producer
- Notable work: Dobermann; Blueberry; 99 Francs

Jan Kounen (born Jan Coenen; 2 May 1964) is a Dutch-born French film director and producer. In France, he is mostly known for his films Dobermann (1997), Blueberry, l'experience secrete (2004) and 99 Francs (2007). Outside France he is better known for his interest in Shipibo-Conibo culture and shamanism, with which he became familiar during his trips to Mexico and Peru, and for directing music videos of which the most notable are the four videos he made for the English pop group Erasure in the 1990s (including three for the EP project Abba-esque): Lay All Your Love on Me (1992), Voulez-Vous (1992), S.O.S. (1992), and Always (1994).

== Biography ==
After studying at the Ecole des Arts Décoratifs in Nice, where he directed his first short films, Jan Kounen began work as assistant operator and director of music videos and documentaries. In 1989 he made the short film Gisele Kerosene, crowned Grand Prix in the category of Avoriaz Fantastic Film Festival.

In the early '90s Kounen worked in advertising and made two highly acclaimed short films, Vibroboy and Little Red Riding Hood, the latter seeing him work with Emmanuelle Béart. In 1996 he made his first feature film, Dobermann, starring French actor Vincent Cassel.

In the 2000s Jan Kounen travelled across Mexico and Peru, where he immersed himself in shaman culture and participated in about one hundred ayahuasca ceremonies. His next film was Blueberry (2004), an adaptation of the famous comic strip by Jean-Michel Charlier and Jean Giraud (better known as Moebius), with Vincent Cassel in the title role. The same year, he released Other Worlds (2005), a documentary about shamanism. After making his film Darshan - The Embrace (2005), Kounen staged the Comedy 99 F in 2007, a satire of the world of advertising, adapted from the best-seller by Frédéric Beigbeder and produced by Jean Dujardin.

After participating in Project 8 where he campaigned to improve maternal health in the world, he made Coco Chanel & Igor Stravinsky (2009), a biographical film about the relationship between Chanel, the French fashion designer, and Stravinsky, the Russian composer, starring Anna Mouglalis and Mads Mikkelsen. The film closed the 2009 Cannes Festival.

In 2009 Kounen signed a petition in support of film director Roman Polanski, calling for his release after Polanski was arrested in Switzerland in relation to his 1977 charge for drugging and raping a 13-year-old girl.

== Filmography ==
- Les aventures de Jeff Blizzard (1986)https://auth.wikimedia.org/
- The Broadsword (1986)
- Soft (1986)
- Het journaal (1987)
- Het virus (1987)
- Gisele Kerozene (1989)
- L'âge de plastic (1991)
- Capitaine X (a.k.a. Né pour mourir, 1994)
- Vibroboy (1993) with Michel Vuillermoz
- Dobermann (1997)
- D'autres mondes (a.k.a. Other Worlds, documentary film, 2004)
- Another Reality (TV documentary series, 2003)
- Blueberry, l'expérience secrète (a.k.a. Blueberry, 2004)
- Darshan - L'étreinte (a.k.a. Darshan: The Embrace, documentary film, 2005)
- 99 Francs (2007)
- The Story of Panshin Beka, short, segment of the movie 8 (2008)
- Coco Chanel & Igor Stravinsky (2009)
- Flight of the Storks (television film, 2012)
- Vape Wave (documentary film, 2015)
- Mère Océan (documentary film, 2016)
- Mon Cousin (a.k.a. My Cousin, 2020)
- L'Homme qui rétrécit (a.k.a. The Incredible Shrinking Man, 2025)

== Bibliography ==
As author:

- Kounen, Jan (2015). Visionary Ayahuasca: A Manual for Therapeutic and Spiritual Journeys (1st ed.). Park Street Press (published 29 January 2015). ISBN 978-1620553459.

As co-author:

- Narby, Jeremy; Kounen, Jan; Ravalec, Vincent (25 November 2009). The Psychotropic Mind: The World according to Ayahuasca, Iboga, and Shamanism. Park Street Press. ISBN 978-1594773129.
- Metsa; Kounen, Jan (4 June 2014). De l'ombre à la lumière : Voyages d'un guérisseur chez les chamanes (in French). Paris: mamaéditions.com. ISBN 9782845940284.
- Kounen, Jan; Jodorowsky, Alexandro (2 April 2011). Carnets de voyages intérieurs : Ayahuasca Medicina, un manuel (in French). Paris: mamaéditions.com. ISBN 9782845940482.
- Kounen, Jan; Narby, Jeremy; Ravalec, Vincent (28 February 2008). Plantes et chamanisme : Conversations autour de l'ayahuasca et de l'iboga (in French). mamaéditions.com. ISBN 9782845940208.
- Beigbeder, Frédéric; Kounen, Jan; Allix, Simon; Planche, Jean-Luc (24 September 2007). 99 francs, le manuel d'utilisation de la société d'hyperconsommation (in French). Editions SW Télémaque. ISBN 9782753300507.
