= Cécile Cassel =

French actress and singer (born 1982)

Cécile Cassel (HollySiz)
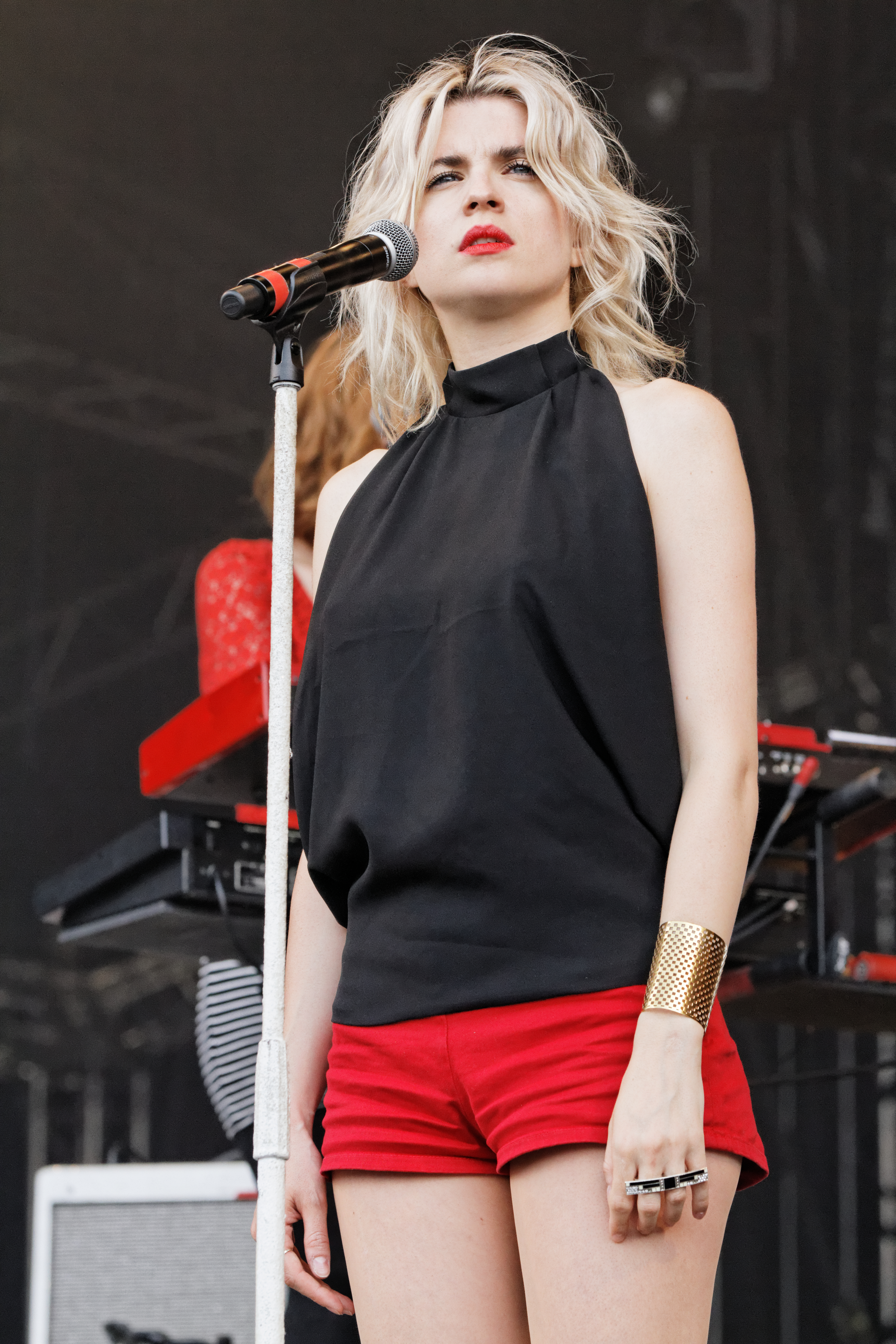
- Cécile Cassel in 2014
- Born: Cécile Crochon; 25 June 1982 (age 44); Paris, France
- Other name: HollySiz
- Occupations: Actress, singer
- Father: Jean-Pierre Cassel
- Relatives: Vincent Cassel (half-brother); Mathias Cassel (half-brother); Deva Cassel (half-niece)

Cécile Crochon (French: [sesil kʁɔʃɔ̃]), better known by the stage name Cécile Cassel (born 25 June 1982), is a French actress and singer. Since 2002, she has appeared in a number of films and television series. She is also a recording artist using the stage name HollySiz.

Cassell giving an interview about her work in 2013

== Biography ==
She is the half-sister of actor Vincent Cassel and MC Mathias Cassel, and the daughter of Jean-Pierre Cassel. She has been in relationships with the French actor Gaspard Ulliel and the music producer Raphaël Hamburger.

== Discography ==
=== Albums ===
Year	Album	Peak positions		Certification
Year	Album	FR	BEL (Wa)	Certification
2013	My Name Is (credited as HollySiz)	30	116	
2018	Rather Than Talking (credited as HollySiz)			

=== Singles ===
Year	Singles	Peak positions		Certification	Album
Year	Singles	FR	BEL (Wa)	Certification	Album
2013	"Come Back to Me" (credited as HollySiz)	22	20* (Ultratip)		
2014	"Tricky Game" (credited as HollySiz)	113	–		
2017	"Fox" (credited as HollySiz)	120	–		

*Did not appear in the official Belgian Ultratop 50 charts, but rather in the bubbling under Ultratip charts.

== Filmography ==
- La Bande du drugstore (2002), directed by François Armanet : Charlotte Stroessman
- Vivante (2002), directed by Sandrine Ray : Isa
- A l'abri des regards indiscrets (2002), directed by Ruben Alves
- Nous étions libres (2004), directed by John Duigan : Céline Bessé
- Pour le plaisir (2004), directed by Dominique Deruddere : Mireille
- Foon (2005), of Benoît Pétré
- Ma vie en l'air (2005), of Rémi Bezançon : Clémence
- Contre-sens (2005), directed by Pierre-Alfred Richard
- Ô Jérusalem (2006), directed by Elie Chouraqui : Jane
- Les Amours d'Astrée et de Céladon (2007), directed by Éric Rohmer : Léonide
- Le Premier Jour du Reste de ta Vie (2008), directed by Rémi Bezançon : Prune
- Barbarossa (2009), Beatrice I, Countess of Burgundy
- Je vais te manquer (2009), Anna
- Toi, moi, les autres (2010), Alexandra
- Nuit bleue (2010), Antonia

=== Television ===
- 2003 : Sex and the City (Season 6, episode 19) : Chloé
- 2007 : Les Mariées de l'isle Bourbon, directed by Euzhan Palcy
- 2007 : Clara Sheller, directed by Alain Berliner
