= Assassin (group) =

French hardcore rap group

Assassin is a French hardcore rap group formed in the 18th municipal district (arrondissement municipal) of Paris. The group was formed in 1985 by Rockin' Squat and Solo. Later, Doctor L joined them, as well as DJ Clyde. The group had a significant presence on the French underground music scene in the 1980s and 1990s, with lyrics referencing social inequalities and denouncing commercialism.

Rockin' Squat is Mathias Crochon, Jean-Pierre Cassel's son and brother of Vincent Cassel. He has tried for more than 15 years to elevate the mind of the ghetto, similar to KRS-One, Immortal Technique, and Chuck D in the US. The group undertook national tours in France in the 1990s.

== Discography (Assassin) ==
- 1991 : "Note mon nom sur ta liste" (Maxi)
- 1993 : "Le futur que nous reserve-t-il?" (album) (Assassin Productions/Delabel)
- 1993 : "Non à cette éducation" (EP)
- 1995 : "L'homicide volontaire" (album) (Assassin Productions/Delabel), re-released on Virgin France
- 1995 : "L'odyssée suit son cours" (maxi)
- 1996 : "Shoota Babylone" (maxi)
- 1996 : "Écrire contre l'oubli" (EP), re-released on EMI; #32 France
- 1996 : "Underground Connexion" (maxi)
- 1998 : "Wake up" (maxi)
- 2000 : "Touche d'espoir" (album) (Assassin Productions/Delabel), re-released on Virgin France; #11 France
- 2001 : "Perspective" (maxi)
- 2002 : "Assassin live" (album live à l'Olympia), re-released on EMI; #12 France
- 2004 : "Perles rares ( 1989 - 2002 ) (Livin'Astro), re-released on EMI
- 2004 : "Le futur, que nous reserve-t-il?"(Réédition) (Livin'Astro), re-released on EMI
- 2005 : "Touche d'espoir" (Edition 2005) (Livin'Astro)
- 2005 : "Note mon nom sur ta liste" (Réédition) (Livin'Astro)
- 2006 : "Académie Mythique" (Best of CD & DVD) (Livin' Astro), re-released on EMI

== Discography (Rockin' Squat) ==
- 2002 : "Illegal mixtapes" (Street album) (Assassin Productions)
- 2003 : "Illegal mixtapes 2" (Street album) (Livin'Astro)
- 2004 : "Libre vs démocratie fasciste" (EP) (Livin'Astro)
- 2007 : "Too hot for TV" (EP) (Livin'Astro)
- 2008 : "Confessions d'un enfant du siècle Vol 1" (Album) (Livin'Astro)
- 2009 : "Confessions d'un enfant du siècle Vol 2" (Album) (Livin'Astro)
- 2010 : "Olympia 2009" (Album Live) (Livin'Astro)
- 2010 : "Confessions d'un enfant du siècle Vol 3" (Album) (Livin'Astro)
- 2011 : "US Alien Chapter one" (Compilation) (Livin'Astro)
