= Amina Muaddi =

Jordanian-Romanian fashion designer

- Born: Romania
- Education: European Institute of Design
- Occupation: Fashion designer
- Label: Oscar Tiye

Amina Muaddi is a Romanian fashion designer.

== Early life ==
Muaddi was born in Romania to a Jordanian father and a Romanian mother. Shortly after, her family relocated to Amman. Her parents split when she was six and she returned to Romania with her mother, where she spent most of her childhood. Muaddi recalls that by the time she was nine, she was determined to work in the fashion industry. After completing her studies at the European Institute of Design in Milan, she worked as an assistant stylist for Condé Nast, Vogue Italy, L'Uomo Vogue and then for GQ magazine in New York.

== Career ==
Muaddi gained an interest in designing footwear and moved to Riviera del Brenta to learn about the trade, working with artisans and suppliers in Italy's historical shoe-making district. Upon returning to Milan in 2013, Muaddi co-founded the luxury label Oscar Tiye, which was featured that year during Milan Fashion Week. She then moved to Paris and worked with Alexandre Vauthier as a designer on his footwear line.

In 2017, Muaddi left Oscar Tiye and launched her eponymous brand in August 2018. Her accessories have been worn by the likes of Bella and Gigi Hadid, Kim Kardashian, Kylie Jenner, and Rihanna.

At the end of 2019, Muaddi was commissioned by Rihanna to design footwear for her brand Fenty and the first drop was launched in July 2020.

In December 2020, Muaddi collaborated with rapper A$AP Rocky and his creative agency AWGE on a footwear capsule collection. She was a member of the jury of the 2020 Vogue Arabia Fashion Prize.

In February 2023, Muaddi was awarded The Neiman Marcus Award for Innovation in the Field of Fashion.

In December 2024, Muaddi promoted her winter collection, featuring K-Pop star Rosé wearing her Lupita crystal slipper in green during a photo shoot for her single "Number One Girl."

== Personal life ==
Amina Muaddi is in a relationship with Fary, a French stand-up comedian. He made his relationship official on his Instagram account in April 2022.

== Awards ==
- Footwear News Achievement Awards: Award for Launch of the Year (2018)
- Footwear News Achievement Awards: Designer of the Year (2019)
