= Vincent Cassel =

French actor (born 1966)

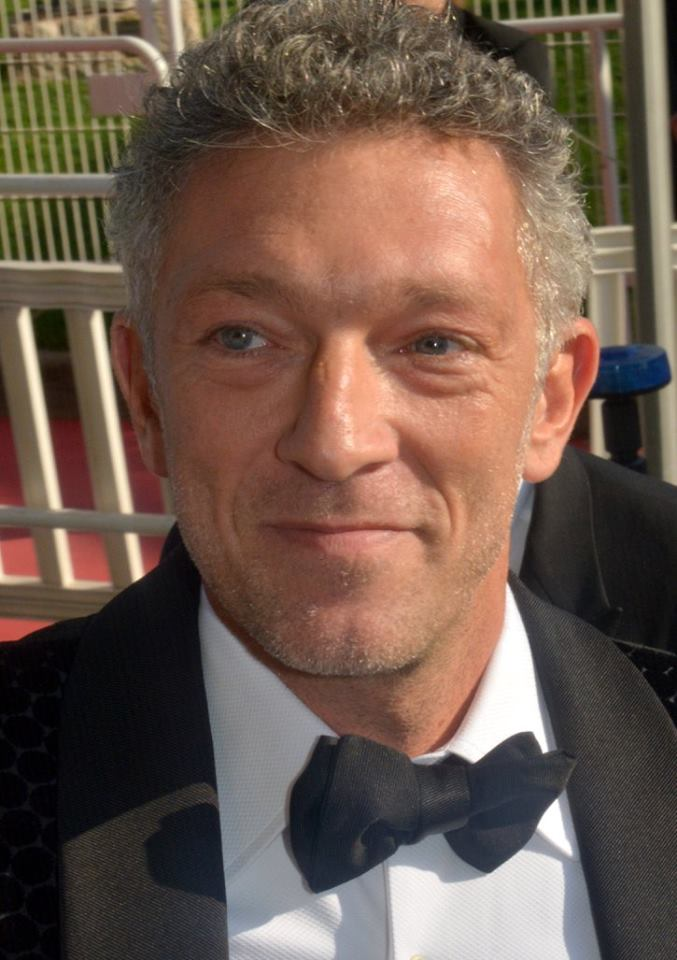
- Cassel in 2018
- Born: Vincent Crochon; 23 November 1966 (age 59); Paris, France
- Citizenship: France; Brazil (until 2018)
- Occupation: Actor
- Years active: 1987–present
- Spouse(s): Monica Bellucci (m. 1999; div. 2013) Tina Kunakey (m. 2018; sep. 2023)
- Partner: Narah Baptista (2023–present)
- Children: 4 (including Deva Cassel)
- Father: Jean-Pierre Cassel
- Relatives: Mathias Crochon (brother); Cécile Cassel (half-sister)

Vincent Cassel (French: [vɛ̃sɑ̃ kasɛl]; né Crochon [kʁɔʃɔ̃]; born 23 November 1966) is a French actor. He has earned a César Award and a Canadian Screen Award as well as nominations for a European Film Award and a Screen Actors Guild Award.

Cassel first achieved recognition for his performance as a troubled Jewish youth in Mathieu Kassovitz's 1995 film La Haine (Hate) for which he received two César Award nominations. He also garnered attention for Gaspar Noé's film Irréversible (2002) which he acted in and co-produced. He received the César Award for Best Actor for his role as the criminal Jacques Mesrine in Mesrine (2008). His other César-nominated roles include Read My Lips (2001), Mon Roi (2015), It's Only the End of the World (2016), and The Specials (2019).

Cassel garnered recognition with English-speaking roles in Elizabeth (1998), Shrek (2001), Ocean's Twelve (2004) and Ocean's Thirteen (2007), Eastern Promises (2007), Black Swan (2010), and Jason Bourne (2016). In 2020, he appeared on the HBO series Westworld.

== Early life and family ==
Cassel was born in Paris, France, to journalist Sabine Litique and acclaimed actor Jean-Pierre Cassel (born Jean-Pierre Crochon). Cassel's brother, Mathias, is a rapper with the group Assassin under the name "Rockin' Squat". His half-sister, Cécile Cassel, is also an actress.

== Career ==
=== Early work in France (1990s) ===
One of Cassel's first on-screen appearances was a bit part in a 1994 Renault Clio advert which was used in the UK.

Cassel's breakthrough role was in Mathieu Kassovitz's critically acclaimed film La Haine (1995), in which he portrayed a troubled youth living in the deprived outskirts of Paris. For his role in La Haine, Cassel was nominated for two César Awards, for Best Actor and Most Promising Actor.

Throughout the 1990s and the early 2000s, Cassel performed in a string of French films. In 1996, he starred opposite Monica Bellucci (before they married) in the moody French film L'Appartement. The film was a critical success, winning a BAFTA Award for Best Film Not in the English Language and the first British Independent Film Award for the Best Film in a Foreign Language. The film was also a modest hit in France gaining 55,565 admissions its opening weekend and 152,714 admissions total. Although the film was never released theatrically in the United States, it was released on DVD on 22 August 2006.

In 1998, he portrayed Henry, Duc d'Anjou in Elizabeth. In 1999, he portrayed Gilles de Rais in Luc Besson's The Messenger: The Story of Joan of Arc. Other notable roles during this period of his career include the violent film Dobermann (1997), Los ríos carmesí (2000), the genre-bending Brotherhood of the Wolf (2001), and the highly controversial Irréversible (2002), where he appears fully nude (with Monica Bellucci, after they married).

=== Transition into English–language films (2000s) ===
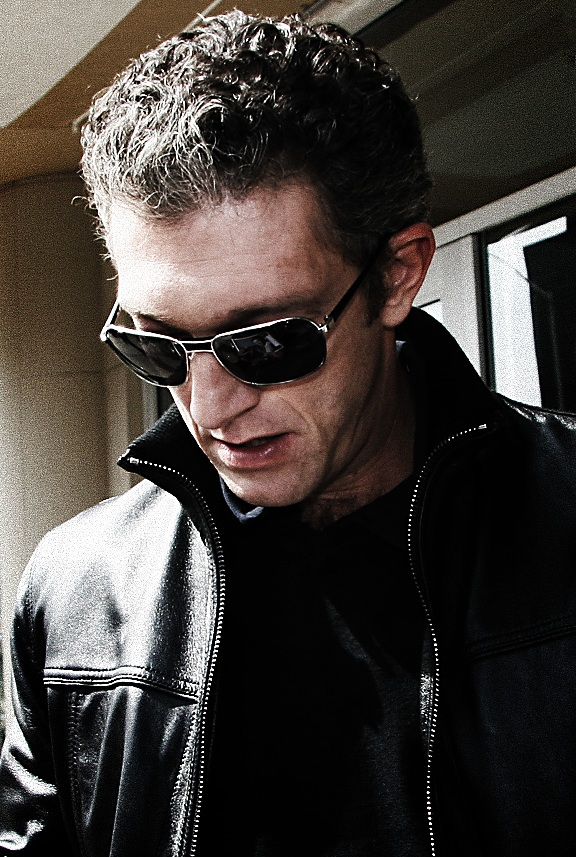
Cassel at the 2008 Toronto International Film Festival

Since the early 2000s, Cassel has also appeared in a number of English-language films, such as Shrek (as the voice of Monsieur Hood) and Birthday Girl (both 2001) Ocean's Twelve and Ocean's Thirteen (2004, 2007), and Derailed (2005). He has also dubbed the voice of Diego (Denis Leary) in the Ice Age franchise and Rodney Copperbottom (Ewan McGregor) in Robots.

In 2007, Cassel attracted significant critical acclaim for his performance in David Cronenberg's thriller film Eastern Promises, in which he starred opposite Viggo Mortensen and Naomi Watts. The film premiered on 8 September 2007 at the 2007 Toronto International Film Festival where it won the Audience Prize for best film on 15 September 2007. Film Journal International critic Doris Toumarkine dubbed Cassel's performance "particularly delicious". J. Hoberman of The Village Voice wrote that "Cassel literally flings himself into [his role]".

In October 2008, Cassel was signed to be the face of a new Yves Saint Laurent men's fragrance. The new fragrance, La Nuit de l'Homme, was launched worldwide in 2009. Cassel appeared in a two-part film about Jacques Mesrine, who was France's "public enemy number one" in the seventies. He won the César Award for Best Actor for his performance as Mesrine. Also that year, he starred in the Portuguese-language, Brazilian film Adrift (À Deriva), and made his debut as a singer on Zap Mama's album ReCreation, singing alongside them on the singles "Paroles, Paroles" and "Non, Non, Non".

=== Later work (2010s) ===
The following year, in 2010, Cassel played Thomas Leroy in Darren Aronofsky's critically acclaimed Black Swan (2010), alongside Natalie Portman and Mila Kunis, which attracted considerable acclaim. For his performance in Black Swan, he was nominated alongside his cast for the Screen Actors Guild Award for Outstanding Performance by a Cast in a Motion Picture.

In 2011, Cassel played the lead role in the French-Spanish thriller-drama film The Monk, directed by Dominik Moll. Screen Daily praised his performance, writing that "Cassel exudes otherworldly gravitas and his singular looks are perfect for the role." That year, he also starred in the German-Canadian historical film A Dangerous Method, directed by David Cronenberg; in the latter, he starred opposite Keira Knightley, Michael Fassbender, and Mortensen (marking their second film together). The film premiered at the 68th Venice Film Festival and was also featured at the 2011 Toronto International Film Festival.

In 2014, he portrayed The Beast opposite Léa Seydoux as Belle in the French-language adaptation of Beauty and the Beast. The film was screened out of competition at the 64th Berlin International Film Festival. It was released in France in February 2014 to positive reviews, becoming a box office success. In Japan, the film topped the box office on its release, making it the first non-English-language foreign film to top the Japanese box office since Red Cliff II in 2009, and the first French film to top the Japanese box office since Mathieu Kassovitz's The Crimson Rivers in 2001.

In 2016, Cassel was featured in American action thriller film Jason Bourne, directed by Paul Greengrass; the film is the fifth installment of the Bourne film series and a direct sequel to The Bourne Ultimatum (2007). Despite mixed reviews, the film was a box office success, grossing more than $400 million worldwide. That year, he also attracted critical acclaim for his performance as Antoine in Xavier Dolan's It's Only the End of the World, which premiered at the Cannes Film Festival. For his work in the film, Cassel won the Canadian Screen Award for Best Supporting Actor; he also received nominations for the César Award for Best Supporting Actor, the Globes de Cristal Award for Best Actor, and the Jury Prize for Best Actor at the Riviera International Film Festival.

In 2019, Cassel played the lead role in The Specials directed by Éric Toledano and Olivier Nakache based on the true story of Stephane Benhamou who ran an organization helping people with autism find employment and activities outside the confines of the institutionalized setting. It was screened out of competition at the 2019 Cannes Film Festival and Cassel was nominated for the César Award for Best Actor.

=== Recent work (2020s) ===
In 2020, he portrayed trillionaire Engerrand Serac, the main antagonist of the third season of the HBO series Westworld.

In 2021, he narrated the documentary Reset, directed by Thierry Donard.

In 2023, he starred in the Apple TV+ spy thriller series Liaison opposite Eva Green. Respectively, he starred as Athos in Alexandre Dumas' 1844 novel The Three Musketeers' two French film adaptations; The Three Musketeers: D'Artagnan and The Three Musketeers: Milady, both directed by Martin Bourboulon. In the same year, he was revealed as the voice actor for United Nations' French agent Victor Chevalier in the 2024 video game Tekken 8, making it his first role in a video game. Vincent first came to know Tekken back in the 1990s, with his favorite character being Eddy Gordo.

2024 saw his third collaboration with David Cronenberg, with him playing the leading role of grieving tech entrepreneur Karsh Relikh in The Shrouds, which played in competition at Cannes 2024.

In 2026 Cassel starred in the music video for "Camera" by Charli XCX, directed by Aidan Zamiri.

== Personal life ==
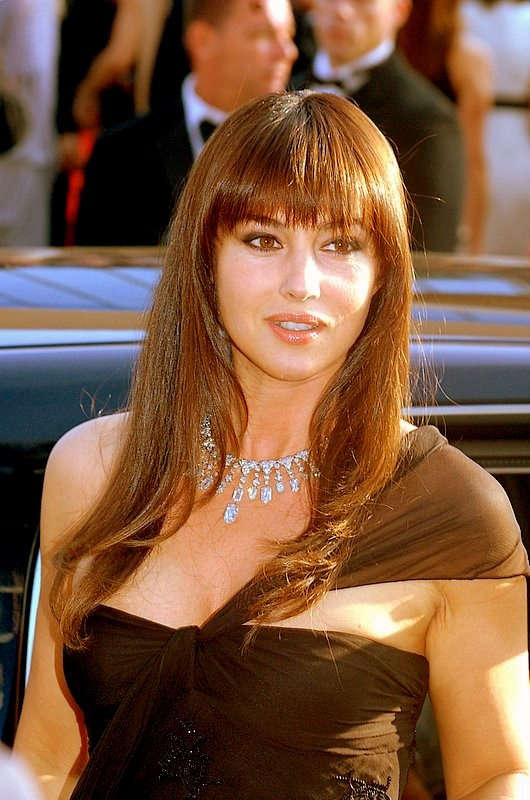
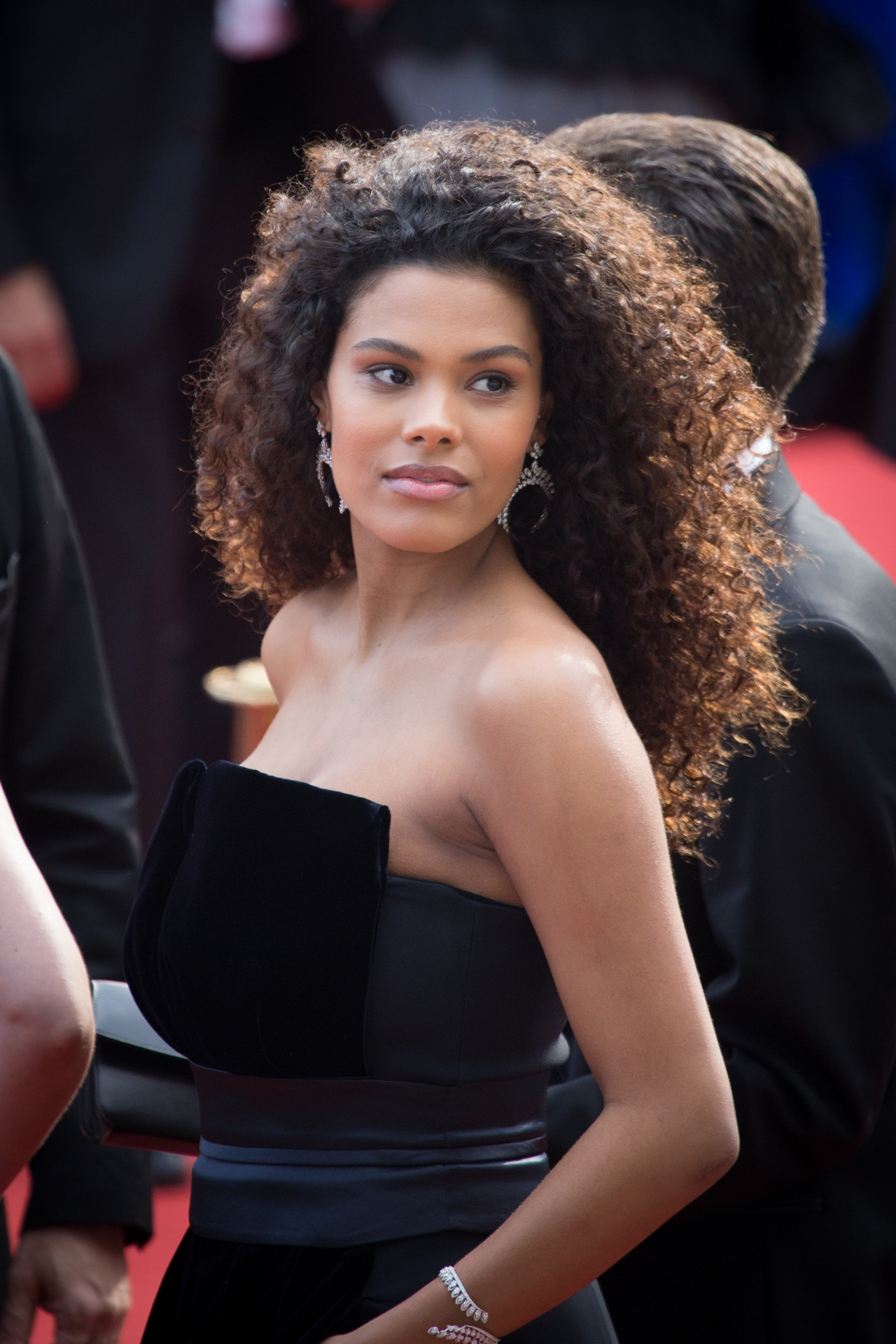
Monica Bellucci (left) was married to Cassel for 14 years. Tina Kunakey (right) was married to Cassel for 5 years.

Cassel met Italian actress Monica Bellucci on the set of their 1996 film The Apartment. They married on 2 August 1999 in Monaco. They have two daughters, Deva, born 12 September 2004, and Léonie, born 21 May 2010. Cassel and Bellucci announced their separation on 26 August 2013. Bellucci filed for divorce the same year. They later divorced. At the age of 15, Deva was Dolce & Gabbana's muse to embody their Dolce Shine perfume and later became their runway model.

He married 21-year-old French model Tina Kunakey on 24 August 2018 in Bidart, France, after being in a relationship for more than two years. They have a daughter, Amazonie, born 19 April 2019. Cassel and Kunakey separated in 2023.

On 20 October 2023, media outlets revealed that Cassel was in a relationship with Brazilian model Narah Baptista, who is twenty-nine years younger than him, six months after separating from his second wife of five years, Tina Kunakey. On 7 January 2025, he welcomed the birth of his fourth and Baptista's first child, a son named Caetano.

Besides his native French, Cassel speaks English, Portuguese, Spanish, Italian, and basic conversational Russian, which he learned for his role in Eastern Promises. Cassel lived in Rio de Janeiro for five years, before moving back to Paris in 2018, and he used to have Brazilian citizenship. Cassel is known for having a great identification with Brazil, being a practitioner of the martial art of capoeira; he displayed this talent in the movie Ocean's Twelve.

Cassel went to various schools, including a Catholic school, eventually becoming irreligious. He opened up about his religious views in an interview, saying: "I'm totally secular myself, and I have a tremendous respect for life. Which means that I essentially believe in God in a certain sense, but I'm not a Catholic or Jewish or Muslim. I'm without a religion."

His father, Jean-Pierre Cassel, died of cancer on 19 April 2007 aged 74.

== Filmography ==
Films
Year	Title	Director	Role	Language	Note
1993	Métisse		Max	French	
1995	Adultery: A User's Guide		Bruno Corteggiani	French	
1995	La Haine		Vinz	French	
1995	Jefferson in Paris		Camille Desmoulins	English	
1996	L'élève		Julien	French	
1996	The Apartment		Max	French	
1997	Dobermann		Yann le Pentrec (Dobermann)	French	
1997	Come mi vuoi		Pasquale	Italian	
1998	Le Plaisir (et ses petits tracas)		Michael	French	
1998	Elizabeth		Duc d'Anjou	English	
1999	Unruly		Pitou	French	
1999	The Messenger: The Story of Joan of Arc		Gilles de Rais	English	
1999	Guest House Paradiso		Gino Bolognese	English	
2000	The Crimson Rivers		Max Kerkerian	French	
2001	Brotherhood of the Wolf		Jean-François de Morangias	French	
2001	Shrek		Monsieur Hood (voice)	English & French dub	
2001	Birthday Girl		Alexei	English	
2001	Read My Lips		Paul	French	
2002	Ice Age		Diego	French dub	
2002	Irréversible		Marcus	French	Also co-producer
2004	The Reckoning		Lord De Guise	English	
2004	Blueberry		Mike S. Blueberry	English	
2004	Ocean's Twelve		François Toulour	English	
2004	Secret Agents		Brisseau	French	
2005	Robots		Rodney Copperbottom (voice)	French dub	
2005	Derailed		LaRoche	English	
2006	Sheitan		Joseph	French	Also producer
2006	Ice Age: The Meltdown		Diego (voice)	French dub	
2007	Ocean's Thirteen		François Toulour	English	
2007	Eastern Promises		Kirill	English	
2007	His Majesty Minor		Satyre	French	
2008	Mesrine		Jacques Mesrine	French	
2009	Adrift		Matias	Portuguese	
2009	Lascars		Tony Merguez (voice)	French	
2009	Ice Age: Dawn of the Dinosaurs		Diego (voice)	French dub	
2009	Planet 51		Chuck Baker (voice	French dub	
2010	Our Day Will Come		Patrick	French	Also producer
2010	Black Swan		Thomas Leroy	English	
2011	The Monk		Capucino Ambrosio	French	
2011	A Dangerous Method		Otto Gross	English	
2012	Ice Age: Continental Drift		Diego (voice)	French dub	
2013	Trance		Franck	English	
2014	Rio, I Love You		Zé	Portuguese	
2014	Beauty and the Beast		Beast/Prince	French	
2015	Child 44		Major Kuzmin	English	
2015	Partisan		Gregori	English	
2015	Tale of Tales		King of Strongcliff	English	
2015	The Little Prince		The Fox (voice)	French	French dub
2015	My King		Georgio	French	
2015	One Wild Moment		Laurent	French	
2015	Violence en réunion		Vince	French	Short film
2016	It's Only the End of the World		Antoine	French	
2016	Ice Age: Collision Course		Diego (voice)	French dub	
2016	Jason Bourne		Asset	English	
2017	O Filme da Minha Vida		Nicolas Terranova	Portuguese	
2017	Gauguin - Voyage de Tahiti		Paul Gauguin	French	
2018	The World Is Yours		Henri	French	
2018	Black Tide		François Visconti	French	
2018	The Great Mystical Circus		Jean-Paul	Portuguese	
2018	Default		Managing director of the IMF	Korean	
2018	The Emperor of Paris		Eugène François Vidocq	French	
2019	The Specials		Bruno	French	
2020	Underwater		Captain Lucien	English	
2020	A Friendly Tale		Marc	French	
2021	Reset		Narrator (voice)	English	
2023	Asterix & Obelix: The Middle Kingdom		Julius Caesar	English	
2023	The Three Musketeers: D'Artagnan		Athos	French	
2023	The Three Musketeers: Milady		Athos	French	
2024	Damaged		Walker Bravo	French	
2024	The Shrouds		Karsh	English	
2024	Saint-Ex		Henri Guillaumet	English	
2024	The Opera!		Charon	French	
2025	Banger		Scorpex	Italian	
2025	Sacrifice		Braken	French	
2025	Le Colisée			English	
2026	Parallel Tales	Asghar Farhadi	Pierre / Nicolas	French	
2026	The Hunchback, Soul of Paris	Jean-François Richet	Quasimodo	French	
TBA	Eleven Missing Days	Jacques Pieters	TBA	French	Filming

Television
Year	Title	Director	Role	Language	Note
2018	Porta dos Fundos		James Bond	Portuguese	Episode: "007 in Brazil"
2020	Westworld		Engerraund Serac	English	
2023	Liaison		Gabriel Delage	French, English	
2024	Fiasco		Robin Jacomet	French	
TBA	The White Lotus		TBA	English	

Music Videos
Year	Title	Artist	Director	Role	Note
2026	"Camera"	Charli XCX	Aidan Zamiri		

Video games
Year	Title	Role	Note
2003	Ghosthunter	Lazarus Jones	French dub
2024	Tekken 8	Victor Chevalier	
2026	Valor Mortis	Napoleon	
