= Shipibo-Conibo =

Indigenous people in the Amazon rainforest in Peru

Shipibo
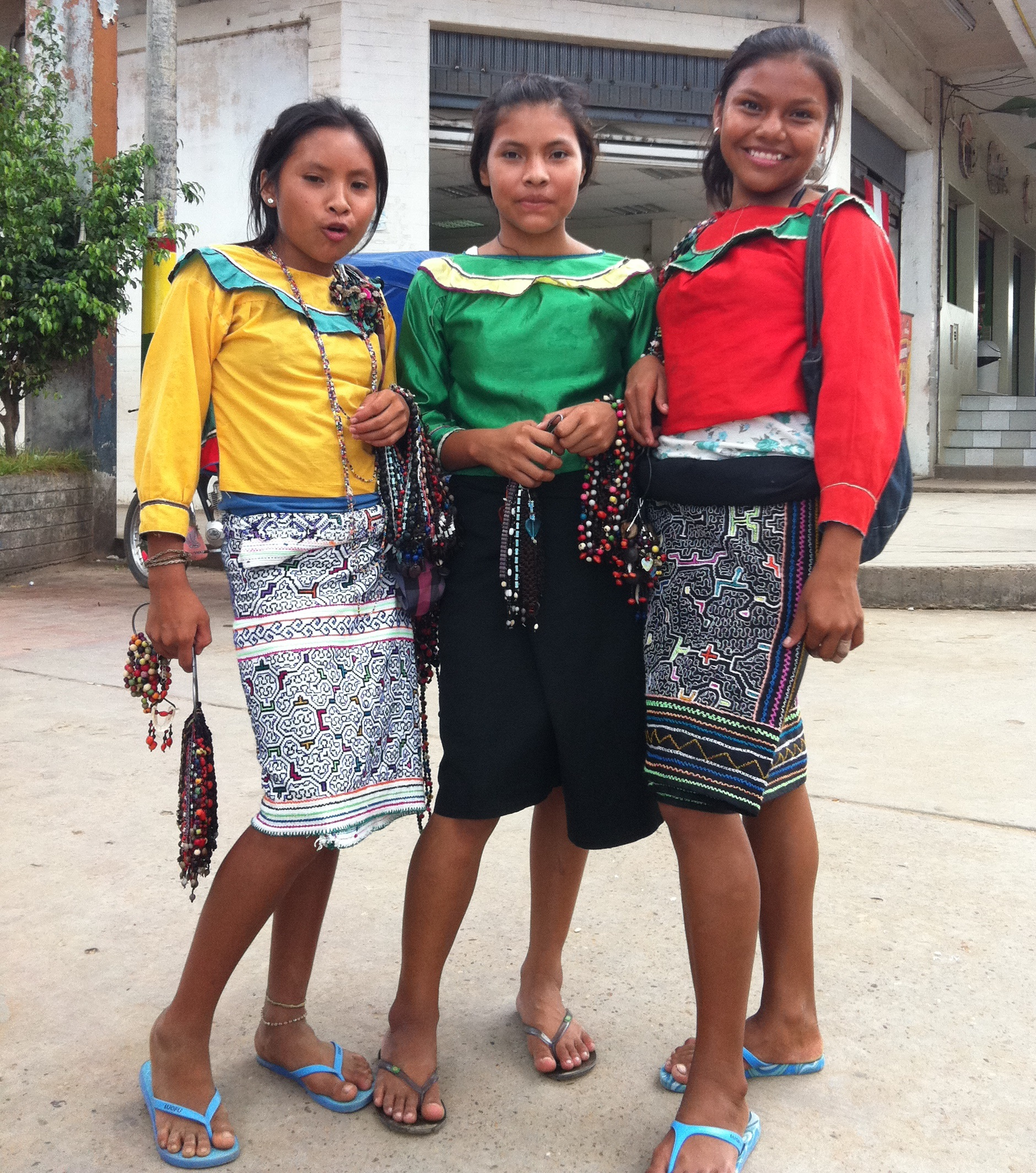
- Three Shipibo girls in Pucallpa wearing traditional textiles

Total population
- 11,000–25,000

Regions with significant populations
- Peru

Languages
- Shipibo, Spanish

Religion
- Christianity, Animism

Related ethnic groups
- Kaxinawá; Yaminawá; Amahuaca; Chácobo; Cashibo; other Panoan groups

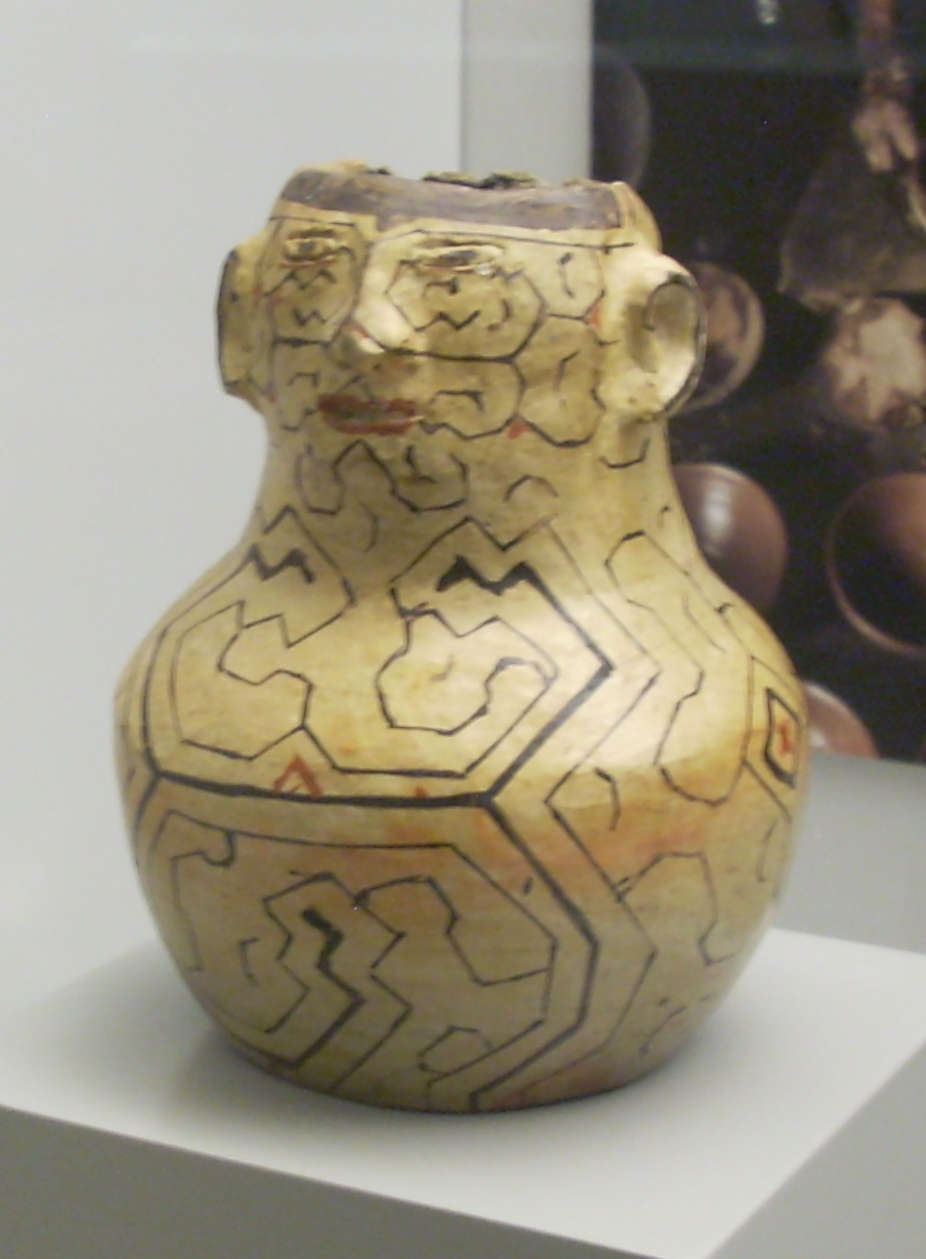
Shipibo pottery in the Museo de América, Madrid, Spain

The Shipibo-Conibo are an indigenous people along the Ucayali River in the Amazon rainforest in Peru. Formerly two groups, they eventually became one tribe through intermarriage and communal rituals and are currently known as the Shipibo-Conibo people.

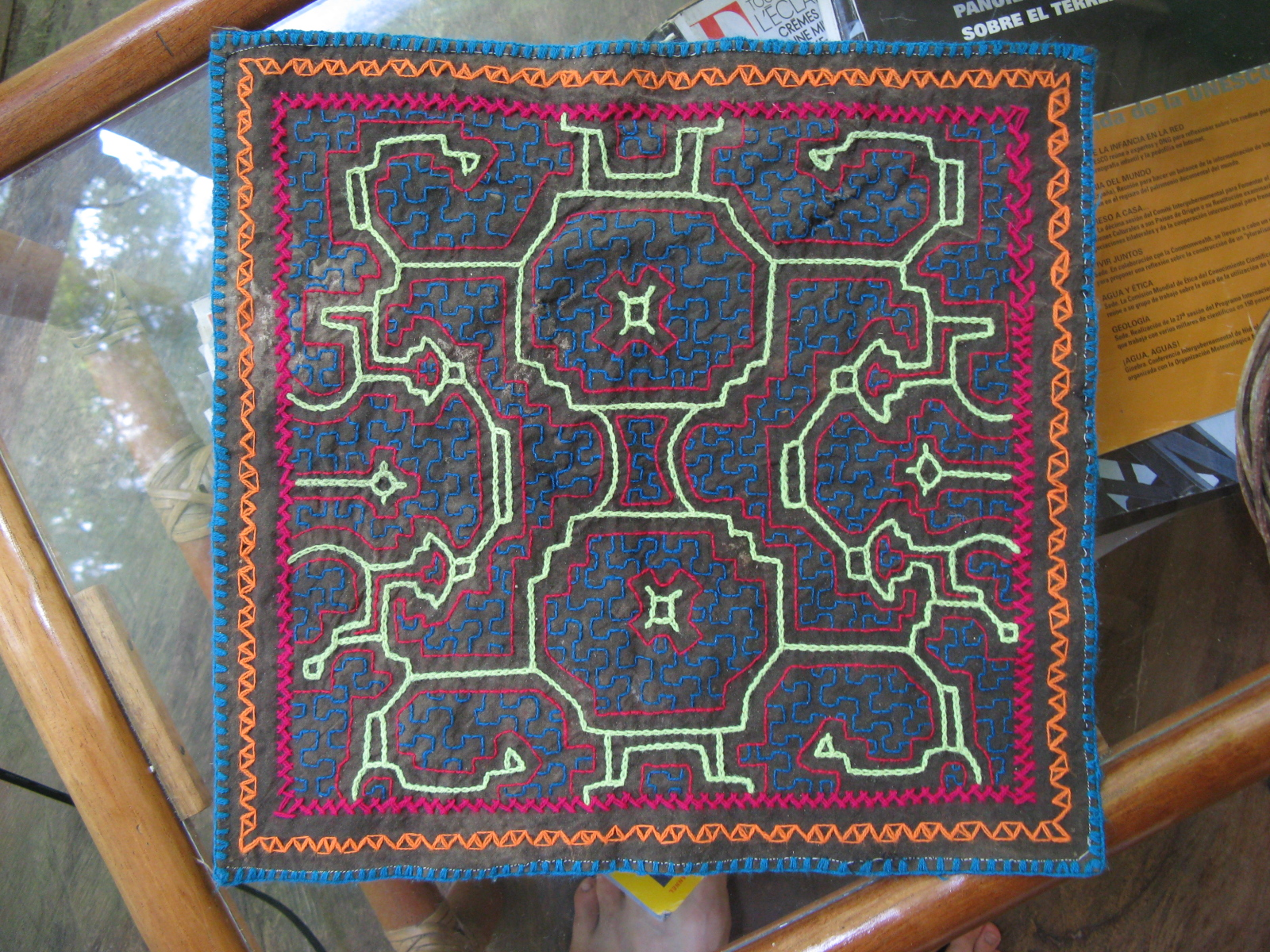
Traditional embroidery featuring the Shipibo-Conibo pattern known as kené

== Lifestyle, tradition, and diet ==
The Shipibo-Conibo have lived in the Amazonian rainforest for millennia. Many of their traditions are still practiced, such as ayahuasca medicine work. Medicine songs have inspired artistic tradition and decorative designs found in their clothing, pottery, tools, and textiles. Some of the urbanized people live around Pucallpa in the Ucayali region, an extensive indigenous zone. Most others live in scattered villages over a large area of jungle forest extending from Brazil to Ecuador.

Shipibo-Conibo women make beadwork and textiles and are known for their pottery, decorated with maze-like red and black geometric patterns. While these ceramics were traditionally made for use in the home, an expanding tourist market has provided many households with extra income through the sale of pots and other craft items. They also prepare chapo, a sweet plantain beverage.

The Shipibo of the village of Paoyhan used to have a diet of fish, yuca, and fruits. The situation has deteriorated because of global weather changes, however, and now, with drought followed by flooding, most mature fruit trees have died, and some of the banana trees and plantains are struggling. Global increases in energy and food prices have risen due to deforestation and erosion along the Ucayali River.

Contact with the developed world—including the governments of Peru and Brazil—has been sporadic over the past three centuries. The Shipibo are noted for a rich and complex cosmology, which is tied directly to the art and artifacts they produce. Christian missionaries have worked to convert them since the late 17th century, particularly the Franciscans.

== Population ==
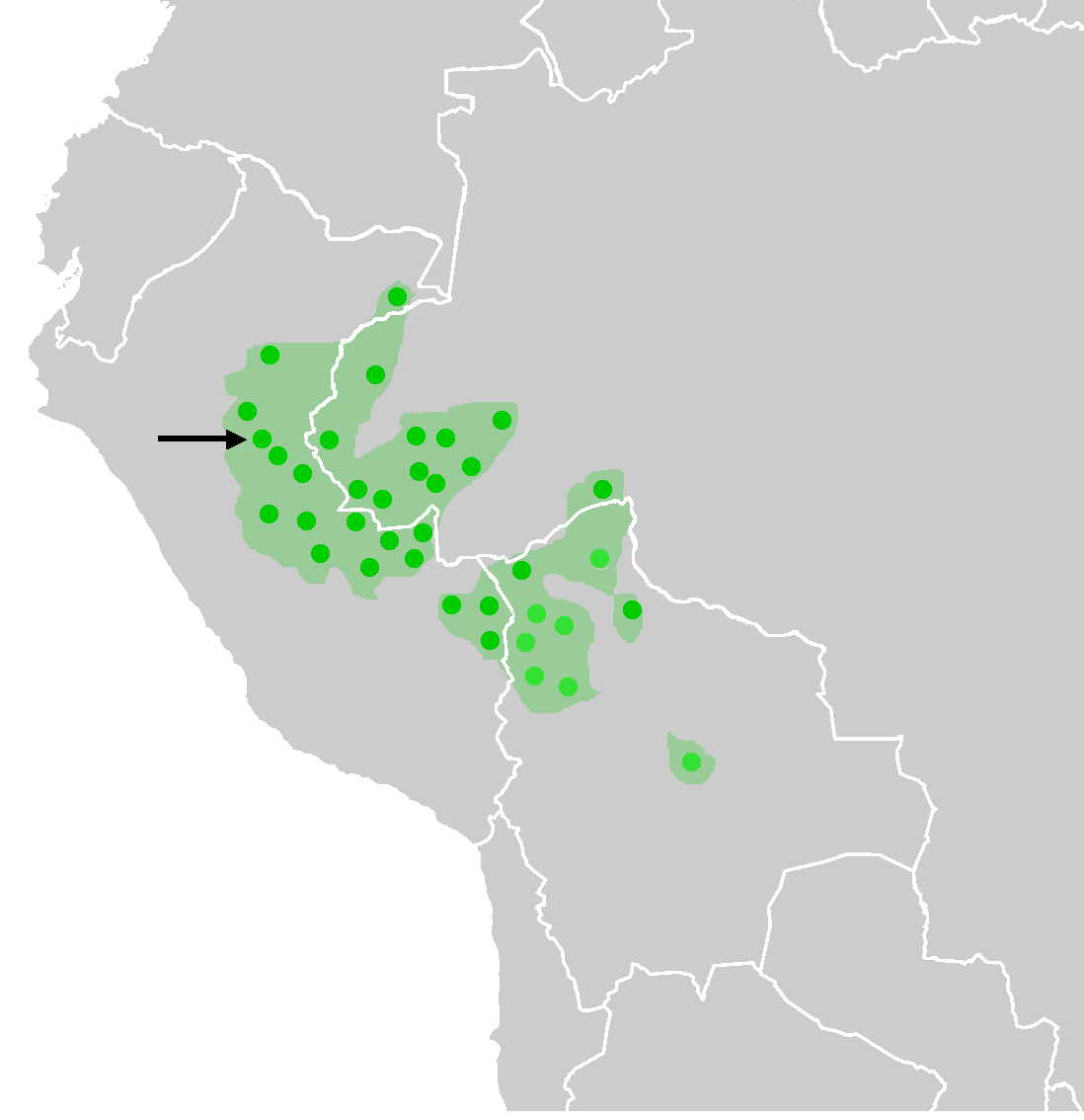
Distribution of the Shipibo-Conibo (marked with an arrow) amongst other Pano-speaking ethnicities (shown in dark green)

With an estimated population of over 20,000, the Shipibo-Conibo represent approximately 8% of the indigenous registered population. Census data is unreliable due to the transitory nature of the group. Large numbers of the population have relocated to urban areas—in particular the eastern Peruvian city of Pucallpa and Yarinacocha District—to gain access to better educational and health services as well as to look for alternative sources of income.

The population numbers for this group have fluctuated in the last decades, between approximately 11,000 (Wise and Ribeiro, 1978) to as many as 25,000 individuals (Hern 1994).

Like all other indigenous populations in the Amazon basin, the Shipibo-Conibo are threatened by severe pressure from outside influences, such as oil speculation, logging, narco-trafficking, and conservation.

== Notable people ==
- Guillermo Arévalo (born 1952), plant medicine healer
- Olivia Arévalo (1937–2018), plant medicine healer
- Rocilda Nunta Guimaraes, indigenous leader and politician

== See also ==
- Shipibo language
- Santa Clara de Uchunya v. Plantaciones de Pucallpa and the Regional Government of Ucayali
