= Shipibo–Konibo language =

Panoan language spoken in Peru and Brazil

Shipibo–Konibo
- Shipibo
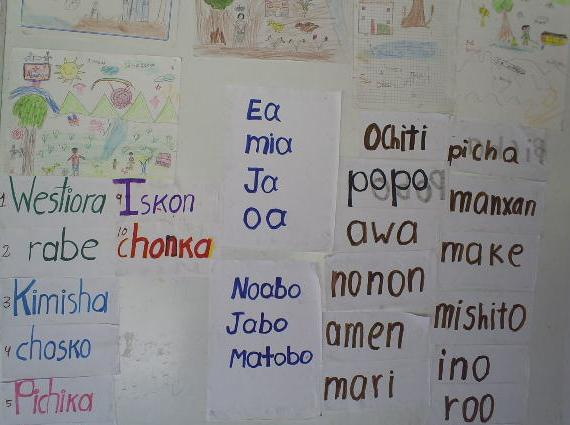
- Native to: Peru
- Region: Ucayali Region
- Ethnicity: Shipibo-Conibo people
- Native speakers: 26,000 (2003)
- Language family: Panoan: Mainline Panoan; Nawa; Chama; Shipibo–Konibo
- Dialects: Shipibo–Konibo; Kapanawa; ?Xipináwa †

Language codes
- ISO 639-3: shp
- Glottolog: ship1254
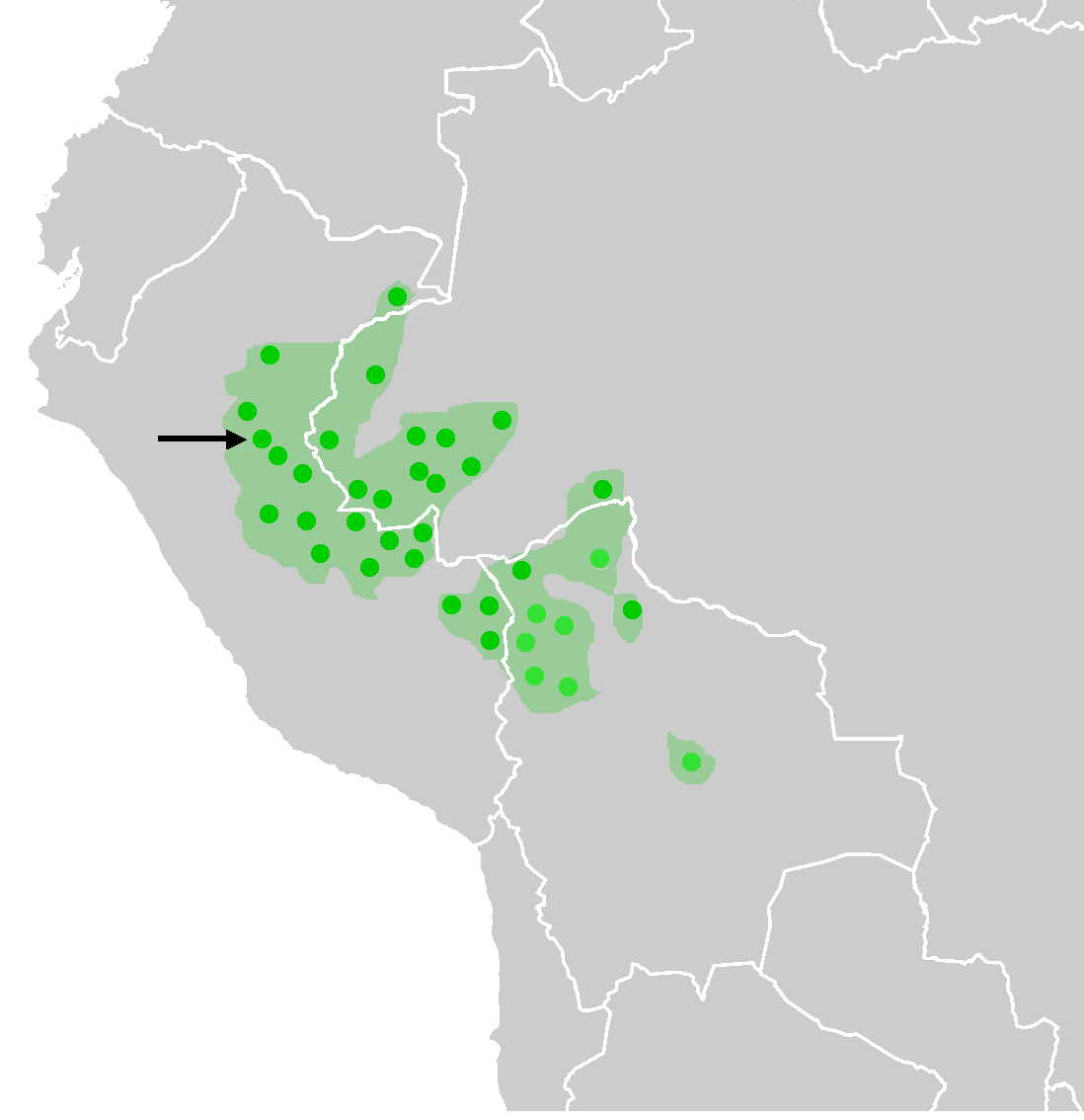

Peruvian national anthem in Shipibo
National Anthem of Peru in Shipibo

Shipibo–Konibo (also spelled Shipibo–Conibo, or simply Shipibo) is a Panoan language spoken in Peru and Brazil by approximately 26,000 speakers.

== History ==
In 1557, the Spanish explorer Juan de Salinas y Loyola encountered the Kokama and Pariache; the latter have been identified as Konibo. He described them as though they had been organized into a chiefdom. Throughout the 18th century, the Shipibo, Konibo, and Xetebo allied with the Kokama to defend their territory from the Spaniards; they were successful until 1790. Afterwards, the Franciscans missionized them until their expulsion in the 1820s. They produced the first surviving works on Shipibo-Konibo, including a Konibo grammar sketch and vocabulary in 1800, though these would remain unpublished until a century later.

== Dialects ==
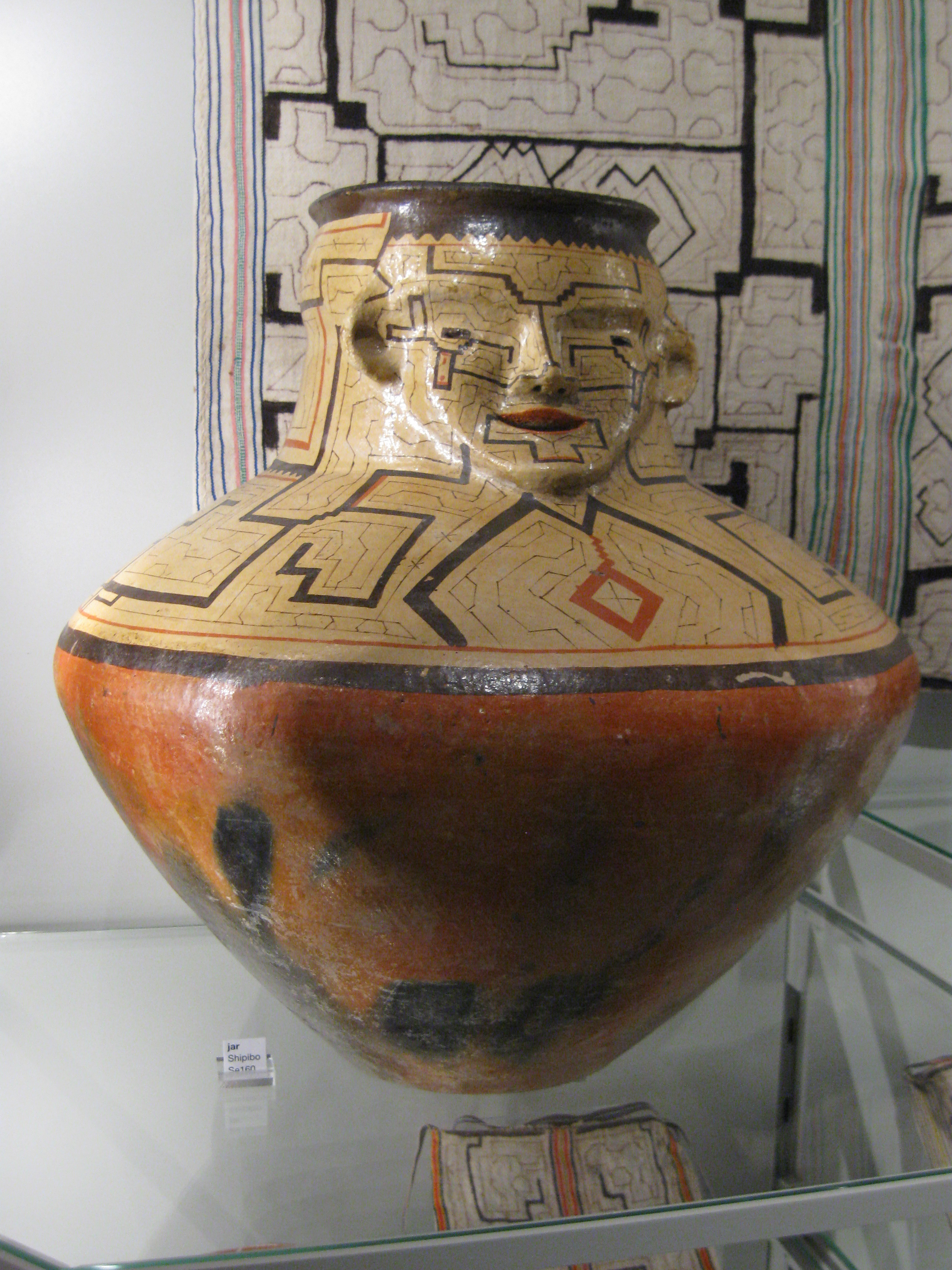
A Shipibo jar

Shipibo has three attested dialects:

- Shipibo 'tamarin monkey ones' and Konibo (Conibo) 'eel ones', which have merged
- Kapanawa of the Tapiche River, which is obsolescent

Extinct Xipináwa (Shipinawa) is thought to have been a dialect as well, but there is no linguistic data.

== Phonology ==
=== Vowels ===
Monophthongs of Shipibo, from Valenzuela, Márquez Pinedo & Maddieson (2001:282)

Monophthong phonemes
| | Front | Back |
|---|---|---|
| Close | i ĩ ⟨i⟩ | ɯ ɯ̃ ⟨e⟩ |
| Mid | | o õ ⟨o⟩ |
| Open | a ã ⟨a⟩ | |

In connected speech, two adjacent vowels may be realized as a rising diphthong. /i/ and /o/ are lower than their cardinal counterparts (in addition to being more front in the latter case): [i̞], [o̽], /ɯ/ is more front than cardinal [ɯ]: [ɯ̟], whereas /a/ is more close and more central [ɐ] than cardinal [a]. The first three vowels tend to be somewhat more central in closed syllables, whereas /ɯ/ before coronal consonants (especially /n, t, s/) can be as central as [ɨ].

==== Nasalization ====
The oral vowels /i, ɯ, o, a/ are phonetically nasalized [ĩ, ɯ̃, õ, ã] after a nasal consonant, but the phonological behaviour of these allophones is different from the nasal vowel phonemes /ĩ, ɯ̃, õ, ã/. Oral vowels in syllables preceding syllables with nasal vowels are realized as nasal, but not when a consonant other than /w, j/ intervenes.

==== Unstressed vowels ====
The second of two adjacent unstressed vowels is often elided. Unstressed vowels may be devoiced or even elided between two voiceless obstruents.

=== Consonants ===
Consonant phonemes
| | | Labial | Dental/ Alveolar | Retroflex | Palatal (-alveolar) | Velar | Glottal |
|---|---|---|---|---|---|---|---|
| Nasal | | m ⟨m⟩ | n ⟨n⟩ | | | | |
| Plosive | | p ⟨p⟩ | t ⟨t⟩ | | | k ⟨c/qu⟩ | |
| Affricate | | | ts ⟨ts⟩ | | tʃ ⟨ch⟩ | | |
| Fricative | voiceless | | s ⟨s⟩ | ʂ ⟨s̈h⟩ | ʃ ⟨sh⟩ | | h ⟨j⟩ |
| Fricative | voiced | β ⟨b⟩ | | | | | |
| Approximant | | w ⟨hu⟩ | | ɻ ⟨r⟩ | j ⟨y⟩ | | |

- /m, p, β/ are bilabial, whereas /w/ is labial–velar.
  - /β/ is most typically a fricative [β], but other realizations (such as an approximant [β̞], a stop [b] and an affricate [bβ]) also appear. The stop realization is most likely to appear in word-initial stressed syllables, whereas the approximant realization appears most often as onsets to non-initial unstressed syllables.
- /n, ts, s/ are alveolar [n, ts, s], whereas /t/ is dental [t̪].
- The /ʂ–ʃ/ distinction can be described as an apical–laminal one.
- Before nasal vowels, /w, j/ are nasalized [w̃, j̃] and may be even realized close to nasal stops [ŋʷ, ɲ].
- /w/ is realized as [w] before /a, ã/, as [ɥ] before /i, ĩ/ and as [ɰ] before /ɯ, ɯ̃/. It does not occur before /o, õ/.
- /ɻ/ is a very variable sound:
  - Intervocalically, it is realized either as continuant, with or without weak frication ([ɻ] or [ʐ]).
  - Sometimes (especially in the beginning of a stressed syllable) it can be realized as a postalveolar affricate [d̠͡z̠], or a stop-approximant sequence [d̠ɹ̠].
  - It can also be realized as a postalveolar flap [ɾ̠].

== Bibliography ==
- Campbell, Lyle. (1997). American Indian languages: The historical linguistics of Native America. New York: Oxford University Press. ISBN 0-19-509427-1.
- Elias-Ulloa, Jose (2000). El Acento en Shipibo (Stress in Shipibo). Thesis. Universidad Nacional Mayor de San Marcos, Lima - Peru.
- Elias-Ulloa, Jose (2005). Theoretical Aspects of Panoan Metrical Phonology: Disyllabic Footing and Contextual Syllable Weight. Ph.D. Dissertation. Rutgers University. ROA 804 .
- Fleck, David W. (10 October 2013). "Panoan Languages and Linguistics" (PDF). Anthropological Papers of the American Museum of Natural History (99): 1–112. doi:10.5531/sp.anth.0099. hdl:2246/6448. ISSN 0065-9452.
- Kaufman, Terrence. (1990). Language history in South America: What we know and how to know more. In D. L. Payne (Ed.), Amazonian linguistics: Studies in lowland South American languages (pp. 13–67). Austin: University of Texas Press. ISBN 0-292-70414-3.
- Kaufman, Terrence. (1994). The native languages of South America. In C. Mosley & R. E. Asher (Eds.), Atlas of the world's languages (pp. 46–76). London: Routledge.
- Loriot, James and Barbara E. Hollenbach. 1970. "Shipibo paragraph structure." Foundations of Language 6: 43–66. (This was the seminal Discourse Analysis paper taught at SIL in 1956–7.)
- Loriot, James, Erwin Lauriault, and Dwight Day, compilers. 1993. Diccionario shipibo - castellano. Serie Lingüística Peruana, 31. Lima: Ministerio de Educación and Instituto Lingüístico de Verano. 554 p. (Spanish zip-file available online http://www.sil.org/americas/peru/show_work.asp?id=928474530143&Lang=eng) This has a complete grammar published in English by SIL only available through SIL.
- Valenzuela, Pilar M.; Márquez Pinedo, Luis; Maddieson, Ian (2001), "Shipibo", Journal of the International Phonetic Association, 31 (2): 281–285, doi:10.1017/S0025100301002109
