= Vegetalismo =

Practice of mestizo shamanism in the Peruvian Amazon

Vegetalismo is a term used to refer to a practice of mestizo shamanism in the Peruvian Amazon in which the shamans—known as vegetalistas—are said to gain their knowledge and power to cure from the vegetales, or plants of the region. Many believe to receive their knowledge from ingesting the hallucinogenic, emetic brew ayahuasca.

== Terminology ==
The term vegetalismo is used to distinguish vegetalistas from other such healers as oracionistas (prayer healers) and espiritistas (spiritist healers). The term is used by followers of Brazilian new religious movements to refer to both indigenous and mestizo ayahuasca shamanism in contrast to their practices. However, among mestizos in the Peruvian Amazon, the term vegetalismo is used to distinguish mestizo shamanism from the traditional shamanism practiced by indigenous peoples. Related religious movements include the more formal União do Vegetal and Santo Daime.

== Structure of vegetalismo ==
The vegetalismo practice combines deep Catholic elements with the animistic religious beliefs common to indigenous tribes throughout the region. Though many vegetalistas declare themselves to be Catholics, they receive their knowledge and power to heal from their special relationship with the spirits of the Amazon rainforest. Vegetalistas maintain relationships with two types of spirits: the spirits of the healing plants, often appearing in human form, and protective spirits, often appearing as powerful animals, birds, or humans. There are other spirit-beings (non-human entities) that exist in the visionary world that can assist the shaman; beings that come from other planets and galaxies, beings that come from infinite labyrinths of crystal rooms, and beings who live in the deep rainforest and beneath the dark waters. In contrast to indigenous shamanism in the upper Amazon, which is based within a rural environment and whose focus is to maintain or restore social balance, mestizo shamanism is based within an urban environment and is focused on individual healing. Many of these mestizo shamans have consultarios (clinics), where they provide consultations and healing ceremonies for patients, as well as other services such as massages and general, simple healing sessions, which usually involve the shaman sucking out the sickness from the patient's body, protecting the body with shacapa and tobacco smoke, and then prescribing an herbal remedy to help the patient in their recovery from the sickness.

== Initiation ==
Although vegetalismo is strongly influenced by indigenous Amazonian cosmology, and to become a vegetalista one must abide by prescriptions that conform closely to those found among Indian tribes of the upper Amazon, vegetalistas do not associate themselves with any specific tribe, therefore there is no community to support the initiation and recognize that the individual has become a vegetalista. One becomes a vegetalista out of personal choice or vocation, and their shamanic powers become recognized gradually as they build up their reputation in the community in which they live.

La Dieta

In order to dominar, or master the plants, one must first prove to the plants that he or she is worthy of their trust. They must show the spirits that they are strong and faithful individuals, and in order to do this they must spend generally a minimum of six months in isolation, living deep in the monte (the wilderness) in order to take on the odor of the jungle and take in the gifts of the spirits, while following la dieta, the restricted diet in order to become a very powerful shaman. La dieta is key to forming a relationship with the plants, for the plants will not reveal themselves, their uses, and their icaros (sacred songs) to those not following the restricted diet. While a neophyte is undertaking la dieta, he or she must abstain from sugar, salt, and sex, and often oil and fat as well. Generally, human beings smell bad to the spirits, so one must go on this long diet in order to purify oneself from this bad odor. One must practice abstinence while on la dieta in order to eliminate the smell of human sex, for to the spirits this smell is vile and repulsive. However, one must do more than the restricted diet in order to learn the plants, one must also ingest the plant, stay loyal to the plant while taking it into his or her body and allowing it to teach from within. Once the neophyte has undergone la dieta and has won the love of the plants, the spirits of the plants will appear to the neophyte either in visions or dreams. It is then that the plants begin to teach the neophyte their magical healing and protective songs, or icaros.

== Gifts of the Spirits ==
Icaros

An icaro is the magic chant or melody that the novice receives from the plant spirits after he or she has been purified by the restricted diet. The word "icaro" may come from the Quechua verb ikaray, blow smoke for healing, or it may come from the Shipibo term ikarra, shaman song. For indigenous tribes throughout the Amazon, songs are a key component in a healing ritual.

La Flema

Once a neophyte's initiation is near completion, either the spirits or a senior shaman will give him or her a magic phlegm, a magical saliva-like substance which is also called yachay, llausa, or la flema. This substance is known to be the materialization of the shaman's fuerza, or power, and it stored within the shaman's body, usually in the chest or stomach. This phlegm grows as a result of smoking mapacho and drinking ayahuasca. Both healers and sorcerers store virotes (magic darts) in la flema, and within the sorcerer's phlegm one may also find creatures such as toads, scorpions, snakes and insects. A rarefied form of this phlegm, known as mariri, is what makes it possible for the shaman to extract harmful magical darts or a sickness from the patient's body while protecting the shaman from the sorcery and sickness that he/she sucks out. The mariri is said to be air-like and its power often comes out in the act of blowing, which can both cure and kill depending on its use.

Virotes

The term virote, originally the Spanish name for a very strong arrow, is a term used in vegetalismo to refer to the magical darts that the shamans and sorcerers store in their phlegm. Poet César Calvo describes a virote as a "very small poisoned dart, capable of abandoning and resuming its material shape in order to transverse any distance; any time; any wall, shield, or protection; to nail itself in enemy flesh and to reach the target selected by the sorcerer who gave it form and then animated that form, endowing it with destiny and transcendence". Depending on the culture and various circumstances, these pathogenic projectiles can be materialized as a number of different things, including the thorns of spiny palm trees, insects, tiny stones, stingray stings, snake fangs, scorpions, toads, monkey hair, among other menacing things. In the practice of shamanism among indigenous groups like the Shuar, these virotes are often referred to as tsentsak.

Magic Stones

Magic stones, piedras encantadas, are an important tool in the practice of vegetalismo. The appearance of the stone varies, some have a striking appearance which indicates that they are encantada, for example the stone may be shaped like a person or animal, have an unusual color, or just be rare. Crystals are particularly prized as piedras encantadas, as they are thought to be of a celestial origin. These magical stones are used to help those patients who appear to be victims of sorcery, the shaman will place the stone on the body where the sorcery has struck and the magic stone will stick there for several hours, sucking out the dart, phlegm, scorpion, or whatever harm has been inflicted there by the sorcerer. In order to master the use of these enchanted stones, the shaman must drink them while following la dieta, just as he does the plants. Before the shaman drinks the water, the stone is left in water for a day, and the shaman blows tobacco smoke over it while telling the stone what it is he wants to know. It is only after this that the spirit of the stone will appear to the shaman in a dream.

== Ayahuasca ==
The ayahuasca ceremony is a widespread practice among vegetalistas, one that has gained a lot of attention in recent years due to the success of the industry of ayahuasca tourism, in which people from all over the world travel to places such as Peru to partake in an ayahuasca session led by a vegetalismo shaman. These sessions vary greatly depending on the vegetalista conducting the ceremony, and there are significant differences between an ayahuasca session held in an urban setting and one held in a rural setting. In urban settings a shaman will usually hold one of these sessions several times a week, and they usually draw crowds of about twenty people or more, many of whom do not know each other. In rural settings the groups are much smaller, usually less than ten people, and the people involved often know each other or have kindred ties. Generally in the urban setting the shaman will meet and speak briefly to everyone in attendance for the ceremony, gathering information on their illnesses and what it is their seeking to find from ingesting ayahuasca. Some people attend these ceremonies regularly as a purge, to cleanse themselves.

== See also ==
- Curandero
- Icaro
- Mestizo
- Shamanism
- Tsentsak
- Tsunki
- Yachay
