= Neoshamanism =

New forms of shamanism

Neoshamanism (or neo-shamanism) refers to new forms of shamanism, typically practiced by Western people as a type of New Age spirituality, without direct connection to traditional shamanic societies. The term sometimes refers to modern shamanic rituals and practices that retain some connection to the traditional societies of their origin, though adapted to modern circumstances. This can include "shamanic" rituals performed as an exhibition, either on stage or for shamanic tourism, as well as modern derivations of traditional systems that incorporate new technology and worldviews.

== History ==
Antiquarians such as John Dee may have practiced forerunner forms of neoshamanism. The origin of neoshamanic movements has been traced to the second half of the twentieth century, especially to counterculture movements and post-modernism. Three writers in particular are seen as promoting and spreading ideas related to shamanism and neoshamanism: Mircea Eliade, Carlos Castaneda, and Michael Harner.

In 1951, Mircea Eliade popularized the idea of the shaman with the publication of Shamanism: Archaic Techniques of Ecstasy. In it, he wrote that shamanism represented a kind of universal, primordial religion, with a journey to the spirit world as a defining characteristic. However, Eliade's work was severely criticized in academic circles, with anthropologists such as Alice Beck Kehoe arguing that the term "shamanism" should not be used to refer to anything except the Siberian Tungus people who use the word to refer to themselves. Despite the academic criticism, Eliade's work was nonetheless a critical part of the neoshamanism developed by Castaneda and Harner.

In 1968, Carlos Castaneda published The Teachings of Don Juan: A Yaqui Way of Knowledge, which he said was a research log describing his apprenticeship with a traditional "Man of Knowledge" identified as don Juan Matus, allegedly a Yaqui Indian from northern Mexico. Doubts existed about the veracity of Castaneda's work from the time of their publication, and the Teaching of Don Juan, along with Castaneda's subsequent works, are now widely regarded as works of fiction. Although Castaneda's works have been extensively debunked, they nevertheless brought "...what he considered (nearly) universal traditional shamanic elements into an acultural package of practices for the modern shamanic seeker and participant."

The idea of an acultural shamanism was further developed by Michael Harner in his 1980 book The Way of the Shaman. Harner developed his own system of acultural shamanism that he called "Core Shamanism" (see below), which he wrote was based on his experiences with Conibo and Jívaro shamans in South America, including the consumption of hallucinogens. Harner broadly applied the term "shaman" to spiritual and ceremonial leaders in cultures that do not use this term, saying that he also studied with "shamans" in North America; he wrote that these were Wintu, Pomo, Coast Salish, and Lakota people, but he did not name any individuals or specific communities. Harner wrote that he was describing common elements of shamanic practice found among Indigenous people world-wide, having stripped those elements of specific cultural content so as to render them accessible to contemporary Western spiritual seekers. Influences cited by Harner also included Siberian shamanism, Mexican and Guatemalan culture, and Australian traditions, as well as the familiar spirits of European occultism, which aid the occultist in their metaphysical work. However, his practices do not resemble the religious practices or beliefs of any of these cultures.

== Beliefs and practices ==
Neoshamanism comprises an eclectic range of beliefs and practices that involve attempts to attain altered states and communicate with a spirit world through drumming, rattling, dancing, chanting, music, or the use of entheogens, although the last is controversial among some neoshamanic practitioners. One type of spirit that journeyers attempt to contact are animal tutelary spirits (called "power animals" in Core Shamanism). Core Shamanism, the neoshamanic system of practices synthesized, promoted, and invented by Michael Harner in the 1980s, are likely the most widely used in the West, and have had a profound impact on neoshamanism. While adherents of neoshamanism mention a number of different ancient and living cultures, and many do not consider themselves associated with Harner or Core Shamanism, Harner's inventions, and similar approaches such as the decontextualized and appropriated structures of Amazonian Ayahuasca ceremonies, have all had a profound influence on the practices of most of these neoshamanic groups. Wallis writes,

By downplaying the role of cultural specificity, Harnerism and other neo-Shamanisms can be accused of homogenising shamanisms and, worse, ignoring the people whose "techniques" have been 'used' (others may be correct in preferring the terms 'borrowed', 'appropriated', or 'stolen'). While reference to the Shuar, Conibo or other native shamans may be made, it is reasonable to suggest that from the way Harner presents core-shamanism in his book, a neo-Shaman need never know about traditional shamans in order to learn the techniques. Indeed, in a troubling equation, native shamans are merely used to legitimate neo-Shamanic techniques.

Neoshamans may also conduct "soul retrievals", participate in rituals based on their interpretations of sweat lodge ceremonies, conduct healing ceremonies, and participate in drum circles. Wallis, an archaeologist who self-identifies as a "neo-Shaman" and participates in the neopagan and neoshamanism communities, has written that he believes the experiences of synesthesia reported by Core Shamanic journeyers are comparable with traditional shamanic practices. However, Aldred writes that the experiences non-Natives seek out at these workshops, "also incorporated into theme adult camps, wilderness training programs, and New Age travel packages" have "greatly angered" Native American activists who see these workshops as "the commercial exploitation of their spirituality."

=== Differences between shamanism and neoshamanism ===
Scholars have noted a number of differences between traditional shamanic practices and neoshamanism. In traditional contexts, shamans are typically chosen by a community or inherit the title (or both). With neoshamanism, however, anyone who chooses to can become a (neo)shaman, although there are still neoshamans who feel that they have been called to become shamans, and that it wasn't a choice, similar to the situation in some traditional societies.

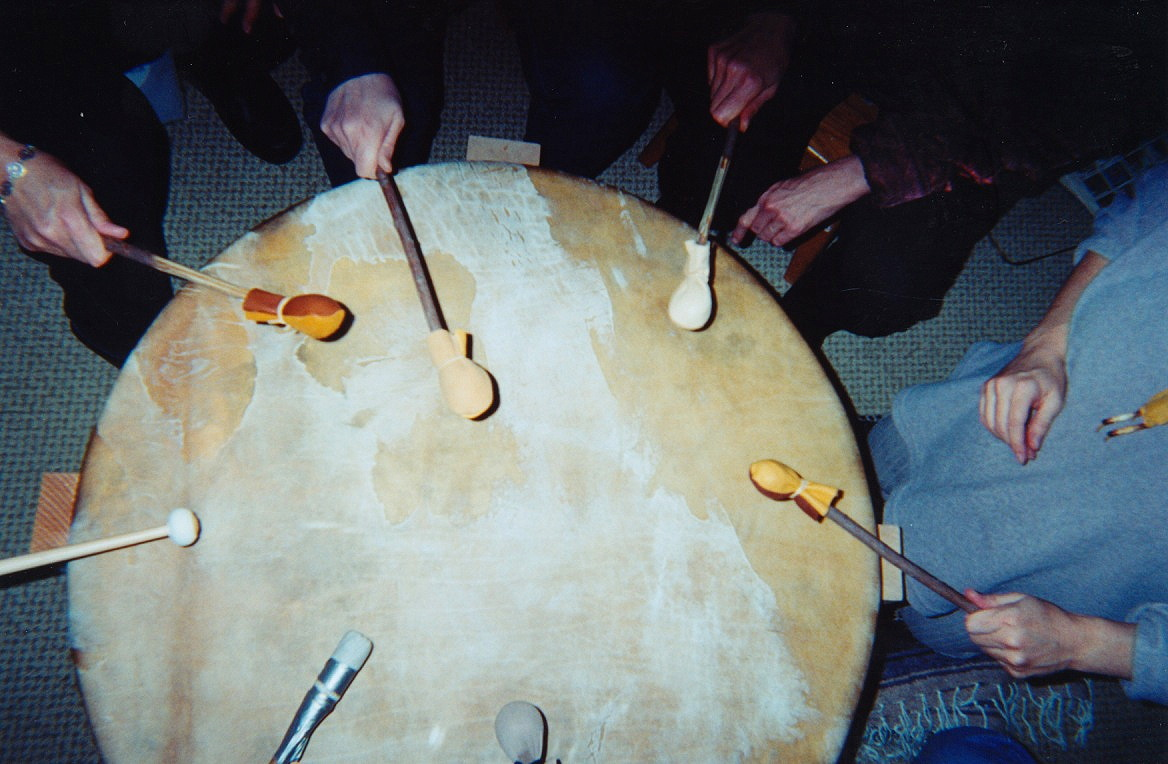
Neoshamanic drum circle in the United States, c. 2000

In traditional contexts, shamans serve an important culturally recognized social and ceremonial role, one which seeks the assistance of spirits to maintain cosmic order and balance. With neoshamanism, however, the focus is usually on personal exploration and development. While some neoshamanic practitioners profess to enact shamanic ceremonies in order to heal others and the environment, and equate their role in modern communities with the shaman's role in traditional communities, the majority of adherents practice in isolation and the people they work on are paying clients.

Another difference between neoshamanism and traditional shamanism is the role of negative emotions such as fear and aggression. Traditional shamanic initiations often involved pain and fear, while neoshamanic narratives tend to emphasize love over negative emotions. And while traditional shamanic healing was often tempered with ideas of malevolence or chaos, neoshamanism has a psychotherapeutic focus that leads to a "happy ending." Harner, who created the neoshamanic practice of Core Shamanism, goes so far as to argue that those who engage in negative practices are sorcerers, not shamans, although this distinction is not present in traditional societies.

Although both traditional shamanism and neoshamanism posit the existence of both a spiritual and a material world, they differ in how they view them. In the traditional view, the spirit world is seen as primary reality, while in neoshamanism, materialist explanations "coexist with other theories of the cosmos," some of which view the material and the "extra-material" world as equally real.

== Neoshamanic tourism ==
Neoshamanism adherents may travel to communities with Indigenous shamanic traditions, or what they believe are shamanic traditions, in order to view or participate in shamanic ceremonies. Some go to other countries seeking experiences and initiations that they believe will make them "shamans" themselves. However, although those who conduct such ceremonies for tourists might come from communities with authentic Indigenous traditions, the ceremonies themselves have been adapted specifically to a tourist context. As this is a financially lucrative business for poor communities, there is also no guarantee that the people offering these experiences have been trained in any ceremonies, or that the substances being offered are what has been advertised. These touristic ceremonies vary in form. In some cases, they might represent public shamanic sacrifices or mass healings. In Yakutsk, a shamanic theatre has been opened for such performances.

Following the publication of articles on Peruvian ayahuasca ceremonies in The New York Times Magazine (2004) and National Geographic Adventure (2006), which included anecdotal accounts of therapeutic effects, tourists increasingly began seeking out encounters with hallucinogenic drugs such as ayahuasca as part of neoshamanic ceremonies. According to Mark Hay, those seeking out ayahuasca ceremonies in the Amazon "contribute to the wanton commodification and fetishization of the cultures whose practices they wish to insinuate themselves into...," especially given that there is no one ayahuasca ceremony shared by all the cultures that traditionally used it; each has unique ceremonies and uses of the brew. Additionally, the practitioners, such as Mancoluto, that offer such ceremonies are not regulated and none have proof of credentials. While deaths are rare, they are not unheard-of; nearly a dozen tourists have died in Peru after consuming ayahuasca.

New Age retreats that offer experiences purporting to be vision quests, sweat lodges, and shamanic initiations, usually lasting a weekend or a week, are also popular. In October 2009, during a New Age retreat organized by motivational speaker and former telemarketer, James Arthur Ray, three people died and 21 more became ill while participating in an overcrowded and improperly set up heat endurance experience, advertised as a "Spiritual Warrior" sweat lodge ceremony, led by Ray. The nontraditional structure contained some 60 people and was located at a new age retreat center called Angel Valley, near Sedona, Arizona; participants paid approximately $10,000 per person to attend. In 2011, Ray was convicted of three counts of negligent homicide. Spiritual leaders in Indian country spoke out against these experiences led by untrained, unqualified people, clarifying that "the ceremony which he was selling bore little if any resemblance to an actual sweat lodge ceremony."

== Criticisms ==
Native American scholars have been critical of neoshamanic practitioners who misrepresent their teachings and practices as having been derived from Native American cultures, asserting that it represents a form of cultural appropriation and that it is nothing more than a ruse by fraudulent spiritual leaders to disguise or lend legitimacy to fabricated, ignorant, and/or unsafe elements in their ceremonies in order to reap financial benefits. For example, Geary Hobson sees the New Age use of the term "shamanism" (which most neoshamans use to self-describe, rather than "neoshamanism") as a cultural appropriation of Native American culture by white people who have distanced themselves from their own history. Additionally, Aldred notes that even those neoshamanic practitioners with "good intentions" who say they support Native American causes are still commercially exploiting Indigenous cultures.

Members of Native American communities have also objected to neoshamanic workshops, highlighting that shamanism plays an important role in native cultures, and calling those offering such workshops charlatans who are engaged in cultural appropriation.

Daniel C. Noel sees Core Shamanism as based on cultural appropriation and a misrepresentation of the various cultures by which Harner said he had been inspired. Noel believes Harner's work, in particular, laid the foundations for massive exploitation of Indigenous cultures by "plastic shamans" and other cultural appropriators. Note, however, that Noel does believe in "authentic western shamanism" as an alternative to neoshamanism, a sentiment echoed by Annette Høst who hopes to create a 'Modern Western Shamanism' apart from Core Shamanism in order "to practice with deeper authenticity".

Robert J. Wallis asserts that, because the practices of Core Shamanism have been divorced from their original cultures, the mention of traditional shamans by Harner is an attempt to legitimate his techniques while "remov[ing] indigenous people from the equation," including not requiring that those practicing Core Shamanism to confront the "often harsh realities of modern indigenous life."

== Demographics ==
The 2011 United Kingdom census was the first that made it possible to write in a description of one's own choosing for religion. The figures for England and Wales show that just over 80,000 people self-identified as Pagan, and 650 wrote in the description "Shamanism." At the 2021 UK census, nearly 8,000 wrote in "Shamanism" - this more than ten-fold increase making shamanism by far the most rapidly-growing niche religious affiliation

== See also ==
- Indigenous intellectual property
- United Nations Declaration on the Rights of Indigenous Peoples
