= Bielawski =

Bielawski (Polish pronunciation: [bjɛˈlafski]; feminine: Bielawska; plural: Bielawscy) is the surname of a Polish noble family originating from Bielawa, Masovian Voivodeship. The family bore the Jelita coat of arms. The same family confirmed nobility in the Russian Empire in Vilnius (Wilno), where it used the Jastrzębiec coat of arms. In Russia this surname is transliterated as Belyavsky (Russian: Белявский, masculine) or Belyavskaya (feminine).

Language	Masculine	Feminine
Polish	Bielawski	Bielawska
Belarusian (Romanization)	Бяляўскі (Bialiaŭski)	Бяляўская (Bialiaŭskaja)
Russian (Romanization)	Белявский (Belyavsky, Belyavskiy, Beliavsky, Beliavskiy)	Белявская (Belyavskaya, Beliavskaia)
Ukrainian (Romanization)	Бєлявський (Byelyavskyy, Bieliavskyi)	Бєлявська (Byelyavska, Bieliavska)

== People ==
- Albert M. Bielawski (1867–1942), American politician
- Aleksandr Belyavsky (disambiguation) – several people
- Christopher Bielawski (born 1973), researcher in synthesis and polymer chemistry
- David Belyavskiy (born 1992), Russian artistic gymnast
- Edmund Bielawski, Polish-Brazilian explorer
- Józef Bielawski (1910–1997), Polish Arabist
- Karolina Bielawska (born 1999), Polish model, television personality, social activist, Miss World 2021
- Maciej Zaremba Bielawski (born 1951), Polish-Swedish journalist and author
- Sergey Belyavsky (1883–1953), Russian astronomer

== Other ==
- Mount Bielawski in California
