= Tsentsak =

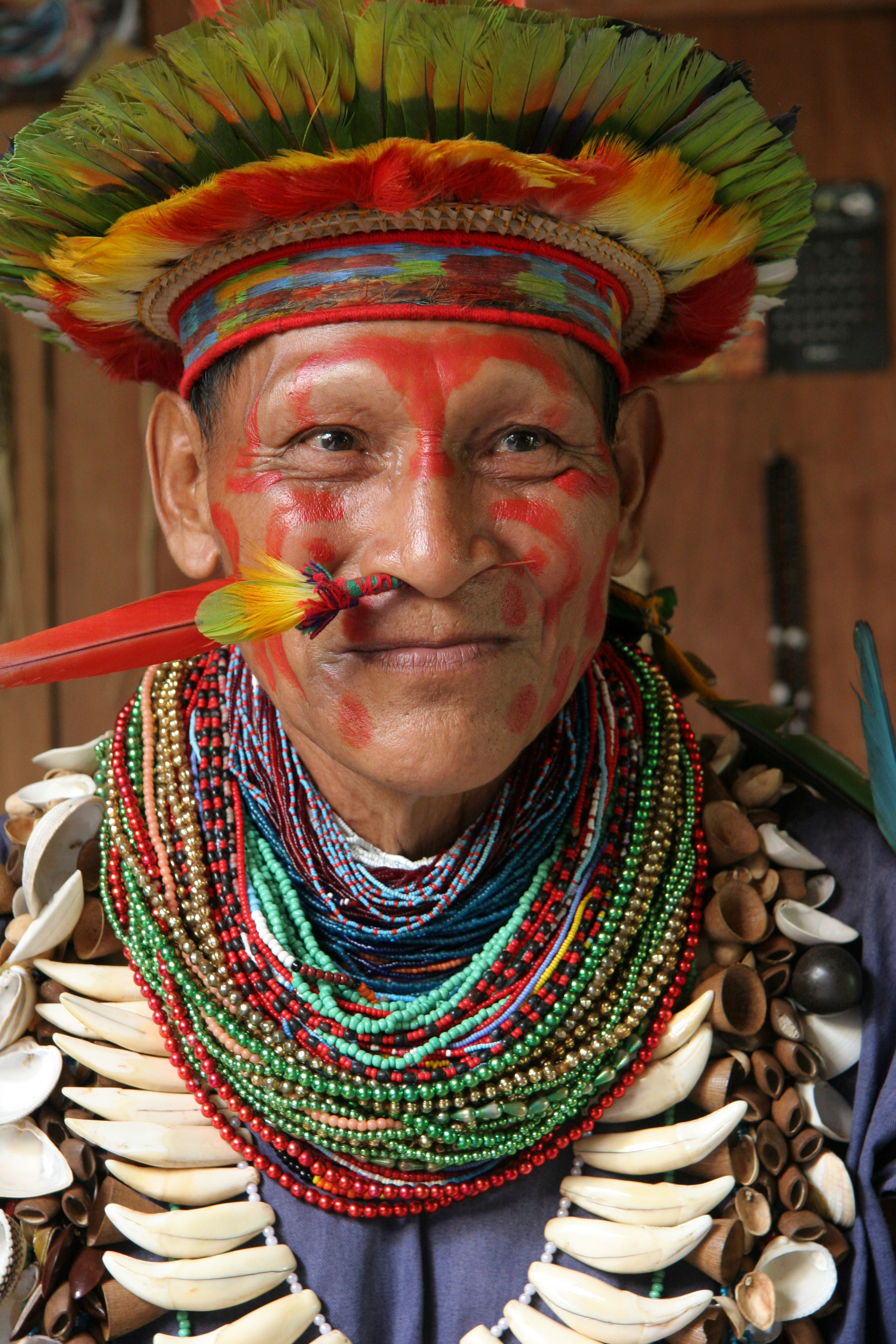
Shaman from an equatorial Amazonian forest, June 2006

Tsentsak are invisible pathogenic projectiles or magical darts utilized in indigenous and mestizo shamanic practices for the purposes of sorcery and healing throughout much of the Amazon Basin. Anthropologists identify them as objects referenced in emic accounts that represent indigenous beliefs. Tsentak are not recognized in scientific medicine.

== Etymology ==
The term tsentsak is derived from the Shuar language, which belongs to the Jivaroan language family. The Shuar are members of the Jivaroan peoples who reside in the Amazon rainforest of Peru and Ecuador. This term is also used interchangeably with virote (primarily by mestizo shamans), a Spanish term for crossbow bolt which was applied to the blow darts made by the Jivaroans from the spines of the Bactris and Astrocaryum palms.

== Use ==
Tsentsak are stored by the shaman in his or her yachay, or phlegm, located in the chest and stomach. The tsentsak are embedded within this phlegm and either the tsentsak or the yachay may be projected out of the shaman into a victim to cause illness and death. This phlegm is the materialization of the shaman's power; it is used to remove tsentsak from the bodies of victims as well as to protect the shaman from being harmed by the tsentsak of others.

Tsentsak are only visible under the influence of a psychoactive substance called natemä, which is the Jívaro word for ayahuasca. When the shaman imbibes natemä, the world of spirits becomes visible. It is at this time that sorcerers and bewitching shamans can send tsentsak to their victims, while conversely, healers and curing shamans can remove tsentsak from their afflicted patients.

Tsentsak are believed to possess their own agency and volition as living spirits that constantly desire to kill and consume human flesh. A shaman must learn to control their darts lest they escape and cause unintended harm. To facilitate control of tsentsak they must be nourished by the consumption of mapacho (Nicotiana rustica), which can be smoked or imbibed as an infusion.

A shaman who does not possess the necessary restraint to swallow their tsentsak when they rise to the back of their throat will become a sorcerer or bewitching shaman, while a shaman who can learn to control these urges will become a healer or curing shaman.

An apprentice shaman who receives their first tsentsak from a predominantly bewitching shaman is likely to become a sorcerer, while the apprentice that receives their first tsentsak from a curing shaman will most likely become a healer.

=== Sorcery ===
Throughout much of the Amazon, tsentsak are believed to be the primary cause of illness and nonviolent death. These magical darts are utilized by brujos, (shamans specializing in attack sorcery) to bring suffering and death to their victims. The darts can be regurgitated at will by the sorcerer and projected from the mouth into the body of the victim. If the dart passes entirely though the victim they will die in three to seven days, however, if the dart becomes lodged in the victim's body, it may be removed by a curing shaman.

The shaman can collect plants, insects and many other objects small enough to be swallowed, which he may then convert into tsentsak. Each variety of tsentsak possesses its own specific attributes and degree of ability to cause illness. The amount and variety of tsentsak collected by a shaman is directly proportional to his power and ability to kill and heal.

=== Healing ===
While sorcerers may use tsentsak for malevolent purposes, healing shamans use these magic darts to create a barrier of protection around their body. They also possess the ability to suck tsentsak from the body of a victim, which can then be sent back to the sorcerer from whom it originated. The healing shaman must imbibe ayahuasca to make the darts visible in the victim's body in order to remove them.

To remove the malevolent tsentsak the curing shaman must suck it out of the victim's body. In preparation for this act the shaman must first regurgitate two of his own tsentsak into the back of his throat. The first is used to block the shaman from accidentally ingesting the malevolent tsentsak, which would most likely lead to his death. The second is used to absorb or dissolve the malevolent tsentsak which the shaman then spits out or sends back to the sorcerer.

== Commodification ==
A shaman will typically receive his first tsentsak from a practicing shaman to whom he has apprenticed. The practicing shaman will regurgitate some of his yachay containing the tsentsak, which the apprentice must then swallow. The apprentice can then keep the darts in his stomach indefinitely. Many shamans will travel great distances to trade tsentsak with other powerful shamans from distant regions. They may also buy and sell tsentsak to increase the potency of their power.

To transfer tsentsak to another individual, both the buyer and seller must consume ayahuasca to make the tsentsak visible. The seller must then drink an infusion of Nicotiana rustica to regurgitate the tsentsak, which is then displayed to the buyer. The buyer then swallows the tsentsak, thereby adding it to his collection. Tsentsak may also be sold in the more tangible forms of tree thorns, insects, small stones, and even pieces of razor blade.

== Dietary and sexual restrictions ==
In the context of Jivaroan shamanism, an apprentice shaman must abstain from sexual intercourse and follow a special diet for a period of at least three months after receiving their first tsentsak. If these restrictions are broken, the darts will leave the body of the shaman and the process must be started from the beginning. To gain the power to kill and cure, a shaman must observe these restrictions for a period of five months.

Mestizo shamans adhere to a similar restrictive diet in preparation for the consumption of ayahuasca before shamanic rituals. These restrictions help to instill self-control and emotional mastery in preparation for a career as a healer. A shaman who breaks the restrictions cannot control the urges of their tsentsak and will become a sorcerer.

== See also ==
- Ayahuasca
- Jivaroan peoples
- Michael Harner
- Shamanism
- Shuar people
- Tsunki
- Tutelary deity
- Yachay
