= Hank Wesselman =

American anthropologist

Henry Barnard Wesselman (1941-2021) was an American anthropologist known primarily for his Spiritwalker trilogy of spiritual memoirs. In them, he claims to have been in contact with "Nainoa", an ethnic Hawaiian kahuna (shaman) living some 5,000 years in our future. The books envision the imminent collapse of Western civilization as a result of global warming. On a more positive note, Wesselman perceives an ongoing "wide-spread spiritual reawakening" which he dubs the "Modern Mystical Movement."

Together with his wife Jill Kuykendall, Wesselman led shamanic training workshops for the Omega Institute and other, similar institutions. They divided their time between northern California, Oregon, and Captain Cook, Hawaii. Hank died peacefully near his home in Hawaii on February 15, 2021 after a short illness. His beloved Jill was at his side. He was 79 years old.

== Professional background ==
Wesselman is a native New Yorker who received his undergraduate degree in zoology from the University of Colorado at Boulder, and his doctorate in anthropology from the University of California at Berkeley. During the 1960s he served as a Peace Corps volunteer in Nigeria, among the Yoruba. He has participated in paleoanthropology research in east Africa's Great Rift Valley. His research speciality is involved with the reconstruction of the paleo-environments of early man sites (See Science magazine, Oct 2, 2009) and the cover story of National Geographic, July 2010.

He was an instructor at American River College and Sierra College, both in California, and has also taught classes for the University of California at San Diego; the University of Hawaiʻi at Hilo; the Kiriji Memorial College in Igbajo, Nigeria; and Adeola Odutola College in Ijebu Ode, Nigeria. The Omega Institute Faculty.

He is the author of the Spiritwalker trilogy—Spiritwalker (1995), Medicinemaker (1998), and Visionseeker (2001)—as well as The Journey to the Sacred Garden (2003); Spirit Medicine (with Jill Kuykendall) (2004); Awakening to the Spirit World (with Sandra Ingerman), The Bowl of Light (2011), and The Re-Enchantment: A Shamanic Path to a Life of Wonder (2016)

== Publications ==
=== Spiritwalker trilogy ===
- Spiritwalker: Messages from the Future. Bantam, 1995 (HC) and 1996 (TPB). ISBN 0-553-37837-6

Describes an ongoing series of spontaneous dream-like visions beginning in the early 1980s, in which Wesselman seemed to connect with and see through the eyes of "Nainoa", a man of Hawaiian ancestry living on the western coast of what is today North America 5000 years after the collapse of the "Great Age" of technology. Nainoa, a member of a Hawaiian-based society which has re-peopled America's west coast. The series begins as Nainoa is sent into the continent's interior on a mission to seek out the descendants of the "Americans" and, if possible, find horses. On the journey, Nainoa explores his shamanic calling, learns of his relationship with Wesselman, and makes contact with the "Ennu", a tribe of hunters and gatherers descended from Canadian Innuits. The Spiritwalker trilogy explores Wesselman's struggles with what to make of these experiences, and records an extraordinary story as the anthropologist is drawn into the shaman's world of mystery and magic.

The future California-Nevada region is depicted as including rainforest and an inland sea inundating the central valley, as well as a wide variety of exotic megafauna such as elephants, lions, longhorn cattle, and several monkey and ape species. Wesselman speculates that the ancestors of these animals may have escaped from zoos or been released from circuses during the collapse of Western civilization. Both human populations shown in the book live at a Neolithic level of technology, with some metal artifacts such as knives and fishhooks.

The sequel books (below) are often compared with the writings of Carlos Castaneda, and reference the work of Michael Harner. Besides Nainoa's future world, Wesselman describes various spiritual experiences, including cosmological visions as well as encounters with spirit beings. (See magical realism.)

Spiritwalker has been published in 15 languages abroad.

- Medicinemaker: Mystic Encounters on the Shaman's Path, Bantam, 1999. ISBN 0-553-37932-1

Continues the story with Wesselman's 1989 return to academic life in California, and Nainoa's c. 70th-century return from the American interior, back to his own society and homeland. There he studies to become a kahuna; makes an enemy in one of the other priests; and meets a love interest, the spiritually-aware Maraea (possibly a descendant of Wesselman's wife, or perhaps of them both). Nainoa inadvertently kills the enemy by calling upon "spotted tiger man", a spirit familiar--identified with a "leopard man" which Wesselman had encountered and painted.

- Visionseeker: Shared Wisdom from the Place of Refuge Hay House, 2002. ISBN 978-1-56170-828-4

Continues Wesselman's story from 1995 to 2000 around a series of eight visions, which Wesselman and Nainoa gradually come to experience together. A key concept is that of the dorajuadiok, a powerful spirit-being which Wesselman describes as a minded "energy field". Much attention is given to Wesselman's exploration of neo-shamanism and other spiritual interests. At one point he learns that his father had experienced similar time-shifts, and was convinced that he had been a seventeenth-century French swordsman.

"Meanwhile", in the far future, Nainoa marries Maraea. Thanks to Maraea's political connections (her grandmother is a "governor"), he is assigned the task of starting a new colony on the eastern shore of their inland sea (i.e., a future, inundated version of California's central valley), with the ultimate goal of building a road which will allow the importation of horses from the Ennu land in the interior.

This volume contains several references to Jesus, including a visionary experience of him by Wesselman. During his training as a kahuna, Nainoa is taught a shamanistic version of the Lord's Prayer which his teacher attributes to the ancient "Americans."

=== Other books ===
- The Omo Micromammals: Systematics and Paleoecology of Early Man Sites from Ethiopia—December 1984
- The Journey to the Sacred Garden. Hay House, 2003. ISBN 1-4019-0111-5 :An introduction to understanding and practicing Core Shamanism. The book includes an experiential CD with drumming and rattling tracks designed to induce altered states.
- Spirit Medicine (with Jill Kuykendall)- July 2004 and experiential CD). :An overview of shamanic healing from the Hawaiian Perspective. The book contains an experiential CD for healing exercises.
- Little Ruth Reddingford and the Wolf - September 2004—for children. A re-imagining of the Little Red Riding Hood story.
- "The Caretaker of my Garden." In The Times of our Lives, Louise Hay & Friends; J. Kramer, ed., Hay House Books, Carlsbad, CA, pp. 220–230. 2007.
- "The transformational perspective: an emerging worldview," in Mind Before Matter, Trish Pfeiffer, John Mack and Paul Deveraux eds., John Hunt Publ, London., pages 200–216. 2007.

2008: "Hawaiian Perspectives on the Nature of the Soul." The Journal of Shamanic Practice 1: pages 21–25.

- "Awakening to the Spirit World: The Shamanic Path of Direct Revelation" (with Sandra Ingerman) - March 2010. This book was awarded the gold medal first place award by the Independent Publishers Association in 2011 for the best body Mind Spirit book of the year. It was also given the first place award by the COVR—The Coalition of Visionary Resources. In this book, two accomplished shamanic teachers join forces to present a modern upgrade of the shaman's practice and worldview for modern people. Includes an experiential CD.
- "The Bowl of Light: Ancestral Wisdom from a Hawaiian Shaman" - May 2011. in which Wesselman records his friendship with the Hawaiian elder kahuna Hale Makua over the last eight years of his life, including their philosophical discussions. Hank Wesselman's account of his eight-year friendship with the Hawaiian elder and kahuna nui Hale Makua includes previously unpublished kahuna wisdom and Polynesian philosophy and has been critically acclaimed.
- "My Encounters with Sekhmet." In Heart of the Sun: An Anthology in Exaltation of Sekhmet, eds. Candace C. Kent and Anne Key, IUniverse Publ, Bloomington, Indiana, pages 104–111. 2011
- "Speaking Woman." The Journal of Shamanic Practice. 4(1): pages 32–36. 2011

2014a: Australian Aboriginal Wisdom. A Journal of Contemporary Shamanism 7 (1): pages 6–8.

- "The Three Stages of Spiritual unfolding." In Shamanic Transformations: True Stories of the Moment of Awakening, ed. Itzhak Beery. Destiny Books, 2015.
- "The Re-Enchantment: A Shamanic Path to a life of Wonder" (2016) includes many of Wesselman's "field notes" of his visionary experiences and initiations including his observations about the unseen forces that affect our lives—spirit helpers, spirit teachers, the spirit guides and the masters of deception who attach themselves to our political, economic, military and religious leaders. It concludes with thoughts from the Hawaiian kahuna elder.

=== Contributions ===
- Hawai'i: True Stories of the Island Spirit - Page 216, "Spiritwalker", July 1999, ISBN 1-885211-35-X
- The Spiritual Gifts of Travel: The Best of Traveler's Tales - Page 99, "Spiritwalker", March 2002, ISBN 1-885211-69-4
- Essay in: "How Do You Pray: Inspiring Responses from Religious leaders, Spiritual Guides, Healers, Activists and Other Lovers of Humanity, ed. Celeste Yacoboni, Monkfish Book Publishing, Rhinebeck New York, pages 156-158. 2014
- "My First Encounter with Sekmet", foreword of Sekhmet: Transformation in the Belly of the Goddess by Nicki Scully,
- * Foreword to: The Evolving Soul: Spiritual Healing through Past Life Exploration, Linda Backman, Llewellan Publications, Woodbury, Minnesota. pages X1-X1V. 2014

=== Selected Research papers ===
- "Fossil remains of micromammals from the Omo group deposits" (with J-J. Jaeger): In Earliest Man and Environments in the Lake Rudolf Basin: Stratigraphy, Paleoecology and Evolution; Y. Coppens, F. Clark Howell, G. Ll. Isaac and R.E.F. Leakey, eds. University of Chicago Press: pages 351-360.1976.
- "Pliocene Micromammals from the Lower Omo Valley, Ethiopia: Systematics and Paleoecology." PhD dissertation, University Microfilms. 1982.
- "The Omo Micromammals: Systematics and Paleoecology of Early Man Sites from Ethiopia," Contributions to Vertebrate Evolution 7: pages 1–219. S. Karger Publ. Basel. (Karger Monograph). 1984
- "Fossil micromammals as indicators of climatic change about 2.4 Myr. ago in the Omo Valley, Ethiopia." South African Journal of Science 81: pages 260-261. 1985
- "Micromammals as climatic indicators: the Omo evidence," in The Longest Record, the Human Career in Africa; volume of abstracts of papers presented at a conference in honor of Professor J. Desmond Clark. 1986
- "Of Mice and Almost-men: Regional Paleoecology and Human Evolution in the Turkana Basin". in Paleoclimate and Evolution, with Emphasis on Human Origins, eds. Elizabeth Vrba et al. Yale University Press, 1995, pages 356–368.
- Asa Issie, Aramis and the origin of Australopithecus, Nature 440, pages 883-889, ISSN 0028-0836, E-ISSN 1476-4687, April 13, 2006.
- "Small Mammals" in Ardipithecus kadabba: Late Miocene Evidence from the Middle Awash, Ethiopia. eds. Yohannes Haile-Selassie and Giday Woldegabriel. University of California Press, pages 105-133, 2009.
- "Taphonomic, Avian, and Small-Vertebrate Indicators of Ardipithecus ramidus Habitat", Science 326 (issue 5949), page 66, October 2, 2009.

And more...

- "The soul cluster: Reconsideration of a millennia old concept." (with Frecska E, Moro, L.) World Futures 2011; 67: pages 132-53. 2011.
- "Tachyoryctes Makooka (Tacyoryctini, Spalacidae, Rodentia) and its bearing on the phylogeny of the Tachyoryctini," (with Raquel Lopez-Antonanzas), Paleontology 56 (1), pages 157-166. 2013.
