= Chicham peoples =

Peruvian-Ecuadorian indigenous people

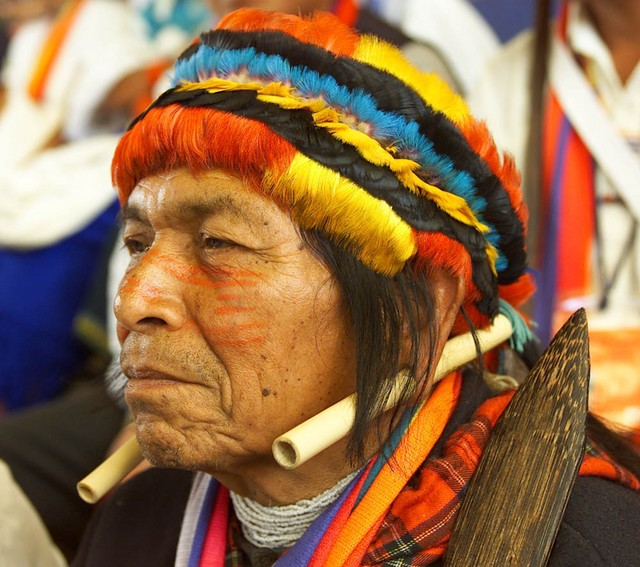
Pwanchir Pitu, Achuar shaman

The Chicham peoples, also known as Jivaro, are the indigenous peoples in the headwaters of the Marañon River and its tributaries, in northern Peru and eastern Ecuador. The tribes speak the Chicham languages.

Their traditional way of life relies on gardening, and on hunting with blowguns and darts poisoned with curare. Complex spiritual beliefs are built around both of these activities. Jivaroan culture also features headhunting raids and ayahuasca ceremonies.

In the 16th century, Jivaroan warriors stopped the expansion of the Inca Empire into the Amazon basin, and destroyed settlements of Spanish conquistadors.

== Etymology ==
The word Jivaro is likely a corruption of xivar, a word that means people in the Shuar Chicham language. During the Spanish colonial period, "Jivaros" were viewed as the antithesis of civilized. The word Jíbaro thus entered the Spanish language; in Ecuador it is highly pejorative and signifies "savage"; outside of Ecuador, especially in Mexico and Jíbaro in Puerto Rico, it has come to mean "countryside people who farm the land in a traditional way".

== Groups ==
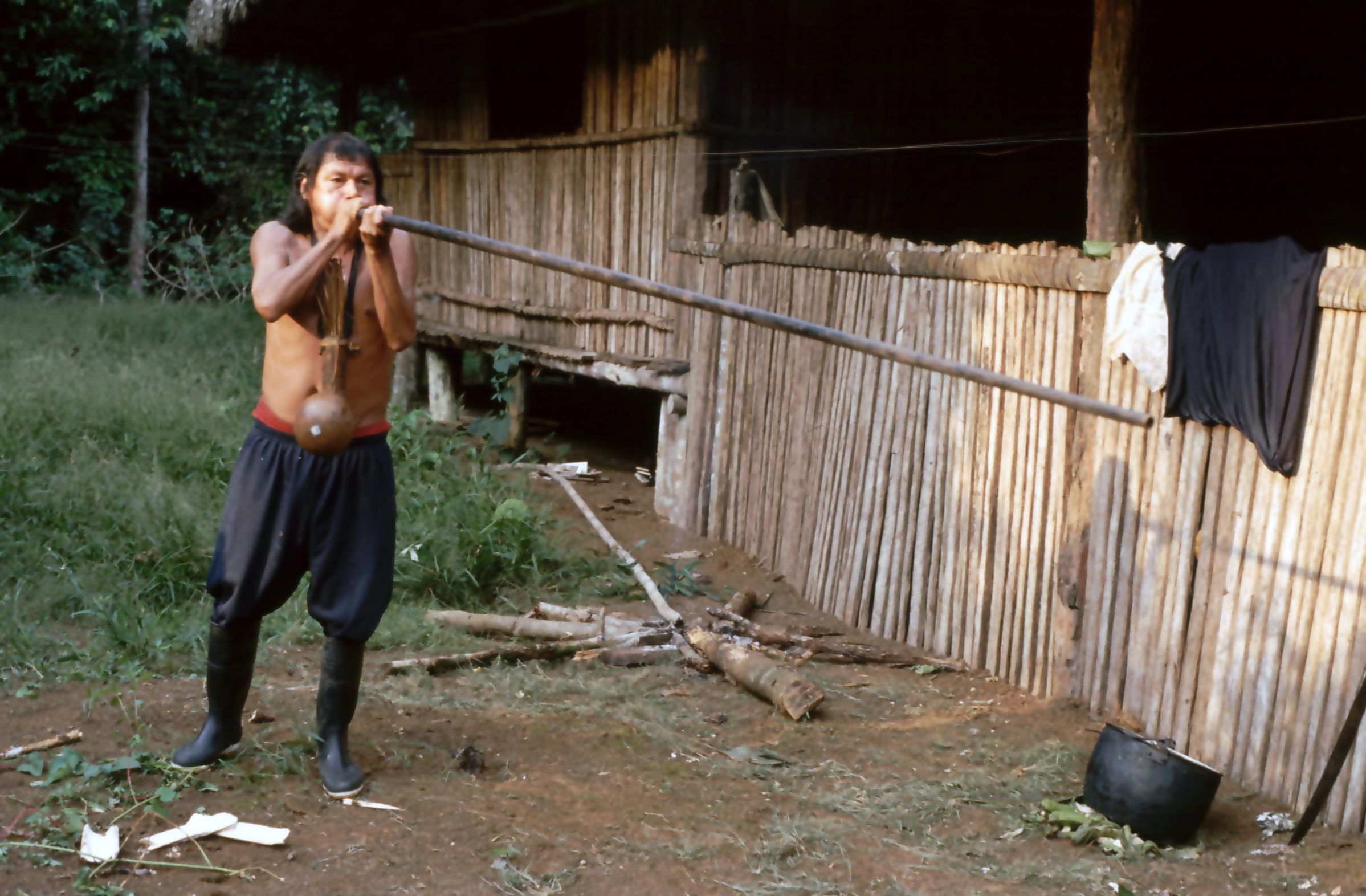
An Achuar man with a blowgun

The principal groups are:

- Shuar
- Achuar
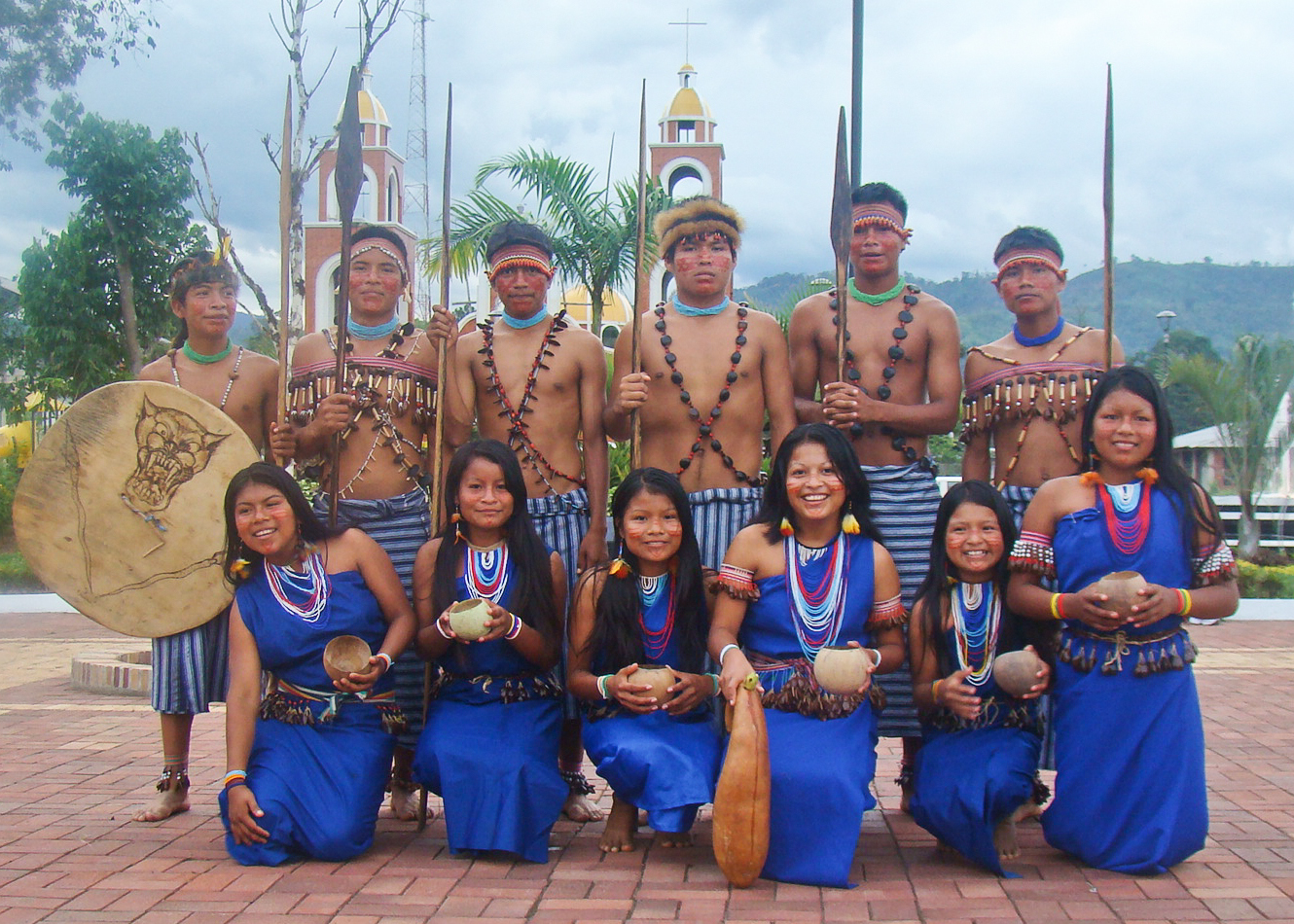
  Shuar in Logroño, Ecuador
- Humabisa
- Aguaruna

Some have also named the following:

- Antipas
- Mayna

Additionally, the Shiwiar are a group of Achuar speakers living along the Corrientes River, next to Quechua speakers; many Shiwiar also speak this other, unrelated, language.

== Religion ==
=== Beliefs and worldview ===
The Jivaroan worldview is built upon the idea that both animate and inanimate objects hold souls that cannot be seen by human eyes. These souls contain power, or karáram, that the Jivaroan people believe can be contained and harnessed within one's self. Michael Harner talks about these souls, called arutam:

"A person is not born with an arutam soul. Such a soul must be acquired, and in certain traditional ways. The acquisition of this type of soul is considered to be so important to an adult male’s survival that a boy’s parents do not expect him to live past puberty without one... By repeatedly killing, one can continually accumulate power through the replacement of old arutam souls with new ones. This “trade-in” mechanism is an important feature because, when a person has had the same arutam soul for four or five years, it tends to leave its sleeping possessor to wander nightly through the forest. Sooner or later, while it is thus drifting through the trees, another Jívaro will “steal” it. Accordingly, it is highly desirable to obtain a new soul before the old one begins nocturnal wanderings. This felt need encourages the individual to participate in a killing expedition every few years."

Percentage of male deaths due to warfare amongst the Jivaro, as compared to other indigenous ethnic groups in New Guinea and South America and to some industrialized nations.

Killing becomes a vital part of the Jivaro culture. Men are only marriageable after becoming hunters within their communities. The more one kills, the more power one has, granting one immunity of death. Violence is a huge part of Jivaroan culture in respect to this type of soul belief. Harner talks about the main systems of belief within the Jivaroan communities:

“Jívaro soul beliefs constitute one of four major autonomous systems of verbalized thought so far noted in their culture. The other three are the systems of crop fairy (nuŋuí) beliefs, of witchcraft beliefs, and the kinship system... Since belief in one of these systems is not explicitly based upon belief in another, an adequate understanding of Jívaro soul beliefs can be achieved without recourse to the beliefs regarding nuŋuí, witchcraft, or kinship."

=== Gods and deities ===
The Jivaroan people have a polytheistic religion. Tsungi is the god of shamanism, and the goddess Nungüi refers to mother earth. Nungüi is described as being a short and heavy-set woman, dressed in a black dress. Living deep underground, she emerges at night to dance in the gardens of women, whose gardens would then become productive for the harvest season. Women sing to Nungui to ask her to protect the gardens, and they carefully weed the gardens daily to appease her. Jivaro believe in a protective spirit that comes to them through spirit visions. This spirit, known as Arutam, is thought to protect them from injury, disease, and death. The Jivaroan gods and goddesses are deeply tied to nature. There are different creators and gods that explain the origins of man and animal, the occurrence of natural events and relationships that exist in daily life. Their creation myths support their violence-based culture as “it is dominated by a series of battles among the gods and an essential duality of where people are the victims.” Among the deities are spirits that are known to provide wisdom and protection to the person they are tied to. Some commonly seen animals are the anaconda, pangi, and the giant butterfly wampang. These animals can assist shamans in healing or bewitching people. Through the Jivaroan worldview, it is believed that sickness and death are caused by attacks on one's spirit by malevolent shamans. The healing shamans will hold ayahuasca ceremonies and perform different rituals to counteract the work done by witchcraft.

=== Rituals ===
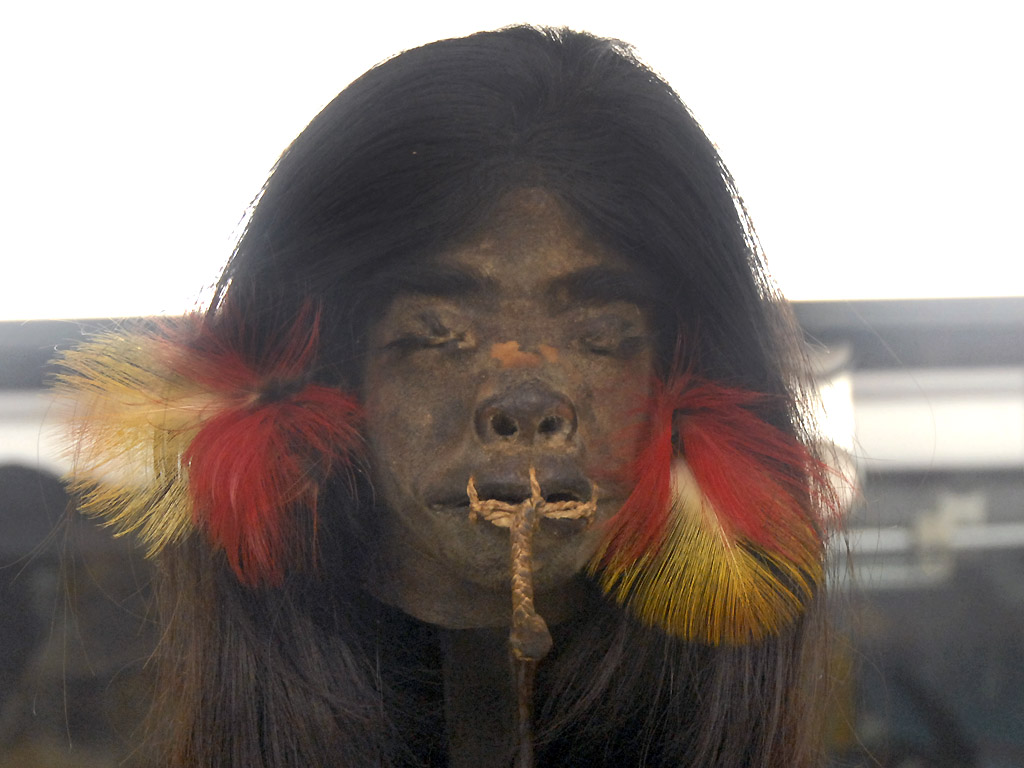
Shrunken head from the upper Amazon region

==== Gardening ====
Unlike many other cultures, the Jivaro cultures place more emphasis on gardening than they do on hunting. This is due to the unpredictable nature of hunting in their native region of the Amazon. As a result, a ritualistic approach to gardening sprouted in the Jivaro cultures.

Despite the reliable, elaborate system of horticulture the Jivaro have developed, they still believe the act to be “…as fraught with uncertainty as hunting” as Michael Brown stated in a paper titled, “Aguaruna Jivaro Gardening Magic in Alto Rio Mayo, Peru.” He then went on to say that in order, “To encourage the growth of their cultivated plants they sing magical gardening songs, perform a set of ritual acts when planting a new garden, and observe certain taboos connected with garden work.” Much like similar beliefs and rituals associated with hunting, the Jivaro believe that spirits reside in the plants and they need to be encouraged to grow by various songs, chants, and dances.

Owing to the belief of spirits residing in the plants, the garden is regarded as a place of great spiritual significance. Like the inside of a temple, the garden is a place where one receives sanctuary.

"It is one of the few places where a woman can go alone without attracting curiosity and suspicion. It offers privacy from prying eyes and ears and is therefore the site of a certain amount of intra- and extra-marital sexual activity"

==== Ayahuasca ceremonies ====
Ayahuasca ceremonies play a large role in the Jivaro culture. These ceremonies are used for healing practices usually directed toward enchanting spirits. Here, Bradley C. Bennett makes note of these healing practices:

"During Healing Ceremony, only shaman and patient drink Natem and will participate in the singing and chanting while the shaman will perform different actions to the patients body thought to heal the spirit."

The shaman goes about relieving the patient of any harmful spirits that may be attacking his or her body. The Jivaro also believe in an act of what may be considered telling the future or telling time. Bennett makes another note of the Jivaro and their ayahuasca ceremonies, where a Jivaro will hire a shaman to tell of far away friends and family.

"The Jivaro shamans, Under the influence of ayahuasca, often believe that they are seeing distant relatives or sweethearts. These distant persons apparently have to be individuals with whom the shaman is already acquainted, so that he can "know whom to look for". Also it is normally necessary for the shaman to be already acquainted with the distant locale and the route to get there, and preferably he should know the appearance and location of the house of the person being sought."

The Jivaro have been practicing these ceremonies for hundreds of years, keeping them held close to their roots. The ceremonies of the ayahuasca brew continue to be practiced.

==== Beliefs ====
The Shuar believe that the first being, Tensak, casts a spiritual dart to curse or heal a person. Bennett recorded that the Tensak "exists in a higher plane of existence that can be seen when in the shaman state." Bennett also observed that, as a shaman works to heal spirits and counter bewitching shamans he will consume Banisteriopsis caapi, tobacco and alcohol to help enhance and fuel his trip from the ayahuasca.

== Confounding factors ==
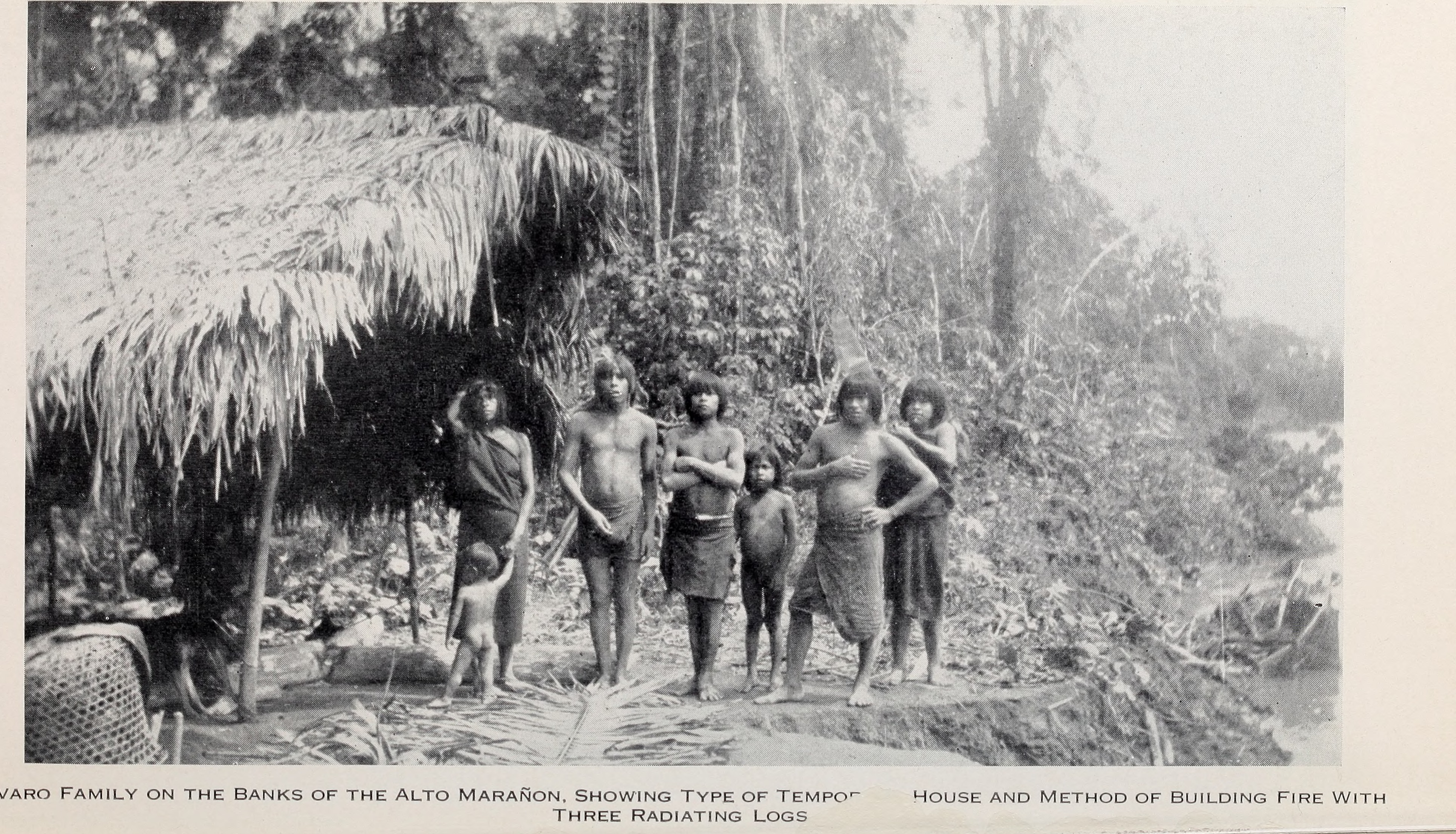
Jivaro family, c. 1901

Anthropologists have recognized the Jivaroan languages as distinct, but have called attention to two confounding factors. The first has to do with nomenclature: Jivaroan language speakers typically identify themselves either by their language's word for person (shuar) or by the name of the river on which they live. Consequently, historical sources record either one name for all, or a plethora names of many small Jivaroan tribes, each the name of a different river.

The second reason has to do with social organization. Prior to Ecuadorian or Peruvian colonization and Christian missionization in the 20th century, the principal unit of Jivaroan social organization was the polygynous matrilocal household or cluster of matrilocally-organized households. Notably, although Jivaroans shared the same language and culture, each household or cluster of matrilocally organized households were politically and economically autonomous. Thus, in 1938 Matthew Stirling commented that:

the Jivaros scattered over this vast territory of approximately 22,000 square miles (57,000 km^{2}) are of similar appearance physically; they speak a single language and their customs, beliefs and material culture are closely interrelated. With this, however, their unity ends. The scores of small independent groups, living for the most part on the headwaters of the tributary streams, are constantly at war, one group with another.

He also said that:

...they live in widely separated household groups with very little consciousness of any sort of political unity. Such groupings as exist are continually shifting location, separating, amalgamating, or being exterminated.

Prior to colonization and the presence of Christian missionaries, Jivaroan speakers were not organized into any stable and clearly bounded polities or ethnic groups.

In response to European colonization and missionization, Jivaroan speakers have formed nucleated settlements that are organized into political federations: the Federación Interprovincial de Centros Shuar and the Nacionalidad Achuar de Ecuador in Ecuador, and the Organización Central de Comunidades Aguarunas del Alto Marañon and the Consejo Aguaruna y Huambisa in Peru.

== Resistance against invaders ==
At the time of Spanish arrival to South America, the Jivaro were an independent culture and hostile to outsiders. The neighboring Incas had tried to subjugate the Jivaroan peoples, but the Inca Empire's expansion attempts failed after a series of bloody confrontations where the Inca army lost against the fierce Jivaroan warriors. The Jivaro put up a similar resistance to Spaniards, who came into their territory searching for placer gold. Until the middle of the nineteenth century, the Jivaroan tribes had only limited and intermittent contact with regional authorities.
