= Tsunki =

Amazonian shaman

Tsunki is a name for the primordial spirit shaman within the Achuar and Shuar people of Amazonia. The term is derived from the Jivaroan language family. It translates to English as "the first shaman" and is frequently alluded to in shamanic songs.

== Water spirit ==
Tsunki is conceived of as a water spirit that frequently appears in the form of a beautiful woman but can also take the shape of an anaconda, a water snake or some other water animal. Tsunki is associated with and can be found near remote waterfalls. The label of Tsunki encompasses a family of multiple Tsunki figures, including a father, his sons and his daughters. Although it encompasses more than one being, it is always referred to in the singular “Tsunki”. Tsunki can also refer to the being as either female or male dependening upon the sex of the viewer. The Shuar language does not include a gender distinction making it impossible to determine the gender of the Tsunki without considering the narrator's gender.

The Shuar see themselves as descendants of the water people whose shamanic power is directly acquired from Tsunki. He/She is the source of all shamanic power and possesses all knowledge regarding tsentsak and has the power to provide shamans with a special crystal form of tsentsak that are particularly powerful. Tsunki's gift of the power to shamanize bestows upon the receiver societal respect and even economic advantages. It can also be a curse resulting in the community never fully trusting the shaman due to the immense power that has been given to the shaman.

== Myths ==
There are two prominent myths about Tsunki's relationship with humans. The first myth recounts a male encounter with Tsunki. The second Tsunki myth describes the bond between Tsunki in female shape and Shuar women. Tsunki aids a Shuar woman to escape her enemies by providing her with tsentsak to defend her and aids her by allowing her to hide in the water.

=== "The Tsunki and the Hunter" ===
Tsunki and the hunter recounts a tale of a Shuar man who has killed a paca (animal) during a hunt with his family. He returns to the beach to sleep and encounters Tsunki. In this myth, Tsunki appears as a beautiful woman. The Shuar man tells Tsunki he loves her and they decide to marry. Upon the approval of the woman Tsunki's father, the Shuar man enters into the water world with her. He lives there for a long time and produces one son with the Tsunki woman. One day they tell him to go see his Shuar women because he has been absent from them for some time. The Tsunki woman was so in love with the Shuar man that she joined him on earth, transforming herself into a snake. She maintained her snake shape at home and resumed a human figure when she accompanied the Shuar man hunting. The Shuar wives were curious because the man always slept alone in the men's quarters and acted strangely. They investigated one day while he was sleeping and discovered him wrapped in a cloak of shining water. The Tsunki woman then became pregnant and as she was unable to accompany the man while hunting, she maintained her snake form and remained at home. She slept curled in a small basket. The next day, when the Shuar man went hunting, he told his Shuar wives not to open or look at the small basket. Upon his departure the curious wives opened it and saw the Tsunki woman as a small pregnant snake. They took her out with a small stick and placed an ember from the fire on her snake form. Tsunki then dissolved into water and seeped into the earth. She returned to her father Tsunki and recounted the mistreatment she had suffered. As a result, the Tsunki father released a slew of anacondas and created a grand storm. The Shuar man noticed the darkening of the sky and realized the reason. He then returned home to his Shuar wives and asked them if they had disobeyed his wishes. They initially denied the accusation but had been found out. The Shuar man responded sarcastically “a piece of good luck is waiting for you!” and he grabbed his daughter and carried her to the mountains. There the screams of the Shuar people being eaten by anacondas could be heard. The water inundated the earth everywhere except for the high palm tree in which the Shuar man and his daughter had climbed. Days passed and then the Shuar was able to descend as the water receded. The Shuar married his daughter when she grew up, thus repopulating the Shuar. The Tsunki also returned to help the Shuar man and further repopulate.

=== "Tsunki and the Chased Woman" ===
A Shuar woman had been taken captive in a war-feud by the Shuar from Patuca and lived as a wife of one of the Patuca members. When the other Patuca members found out that an enemy was still alive they planned to kill her. She heard their screams of revenge and became frightened. Her husband loved her and begged her to run away toward the river for safety. She ran to the river and hid behind a floating trunk in the water. There she heard the voice of Tsunki saying “if you come with me to my home, they cannot reach you”. The Shuar woman followed Tsunki and entered her underwater home. She was given a tortoise to sit on and all of the Tsunki came to hear her tale. The Tsunki were compassionate toward her and gave her their power so that she could defend herself against her enemies. She received their tsentsak through the nose. The Shuar woman could feel the darts cover her body like armor. The Tsunki then accompanied the Shuar woman upriver and saw her enemies but they could not see her. After three days, the Shuar woman returned to her home and everyone was overjoyed because they thought she had died. The Shuar people then began to go to the river in search of Tsunki because they were aware of her goodness.

== Shamanic song invocation ==
I, I, I, I, I, I, I

I am like Tsunki

When I take natem

My body becomes cold

I, I, I, I, I

I am sitting with Tsunki

== Organization ==
A shaman's organization within the Shuar Federation (Federación Shuar). It teaches traditional Shuar and Achuar medicine to shamans with training in gathering and preparing plant medicines.

== Shuar people's beliefs ==
The relationship between Tsunki and the Shuar people is a personalized relationship unlike that of other spirits. Tsunki has a strong social connection to humans and often appears to people are becoming shamans. Shuar beliefs see the water spirit as being innately powerful. The discussion of Tsunki's gender is also a topic of discussion in Shuar beliefs. Male shamans see Tsunki as a female spiritual figure with which intercourse is often practiced. In contrast, female shamans conceive of Tsunki as a male. Non-shamanic people conceptualize the spirit as a male figure.

Interaction with Tsunki and other spirits is obtained through visions facilitated through the use of hallucinogenic plants. The degree of contact between people and Tsunki is also dependent upon a person's actions toward the spirit.
