= Yachay =

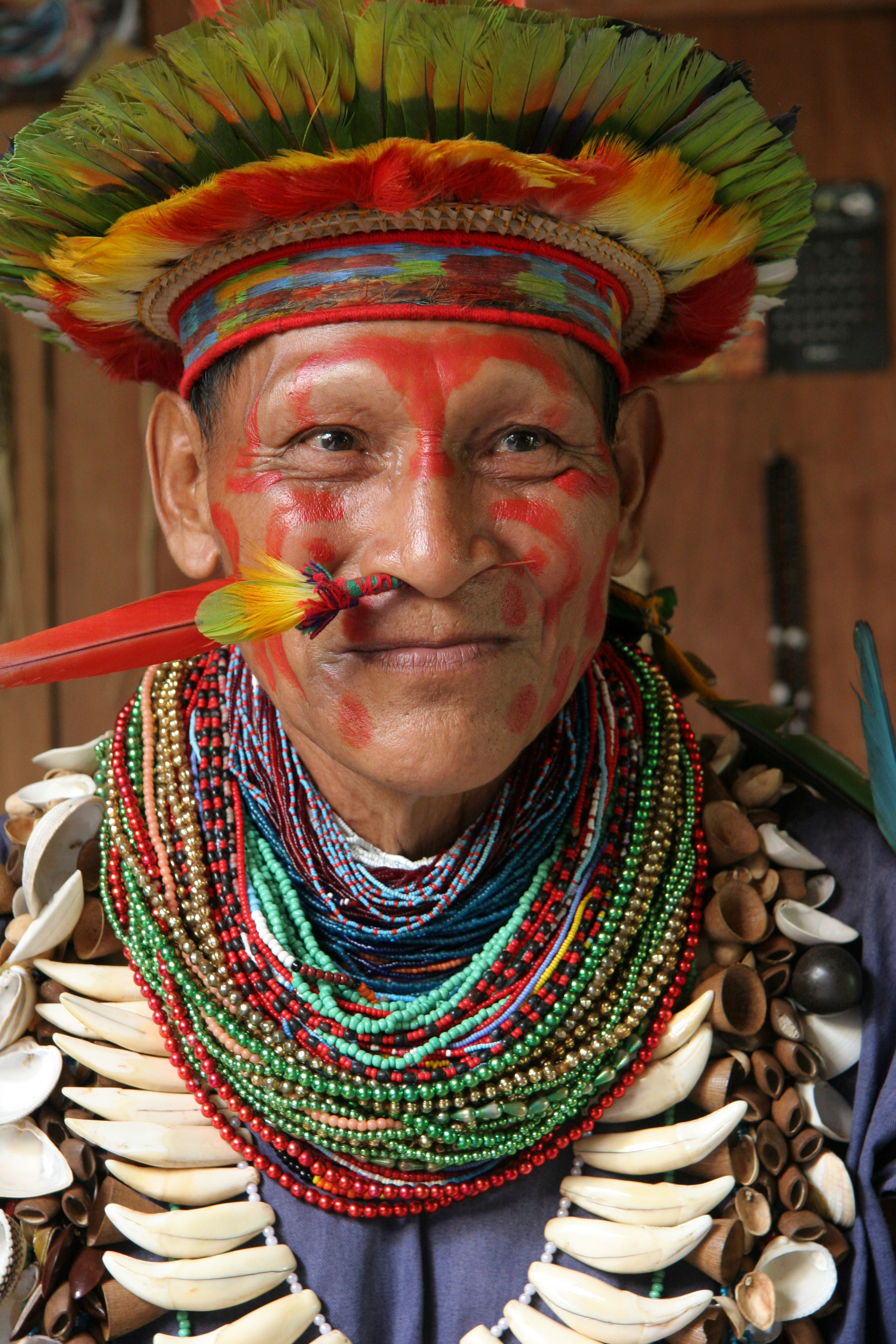
Shaman from an equatorial Amazonian forest, June 2006

Yachay is a special type of phlegm generated by shamans and sorcerers of the Peruvian Amazon Basin which is believed to contain the essence of their power in the form of virotes, tsentsak, darts, arrows, or splinters of bone that are believed to be contained in the phlegm. It is believed that these may be fired from the mouth, and that being pierced by virotes causes various conditions. These may be removed by a shaman, who sucks them out of the victim's body.

== Etymology ==
Yachay is the Quechua word that means knowledge. It is derived from the verb yacha (know), specifically referring to ritual knowledge. Similarly, the word for shaman is yachak, or one who knows.

== Mariri ==
Mariri is the traditional name for a nature spirit that is believed to live in the phlegm. It is believed that the spirit is fed with tobacco smoke. Shamans believe that they can regurgitate the spirit at will and pass it on to a disciple. The disciple either receives the mariri by swallowing the regurgitated substance from the hands of the shaman or by smoking it through a pipe. It is also believed that mariri can be given to someone from nature spirits, such as the ayahuasca plant spirit.

For the kokama of the Ucayali region in Peru, in Kokama language mariri is a synonym of ikara (or icaro in Spanish), that are specific magical songs used in ayahuasca rituals.

Shamans use mariri as a defense and protection in acts of magic, it is also considered a powerful healer.

== See also ==
- Icaro
- Shamanism
- Witch doctor
