= Edmund Bielawski =

Edmund Bielawski (or Edmundo Bielawski) was a Polish explorer and documentary film maker. In 1961 during an expedition to American Cordillera, searching for the beginning of the Amazon River, he captured footage of the human headshrinking rituals by the Shuar people. He also made a film about the Amazon River (Bezkresne horyzonty Amazonii).
