= Bielawa, Masovian Voivodeship =

Bielawa
- Village
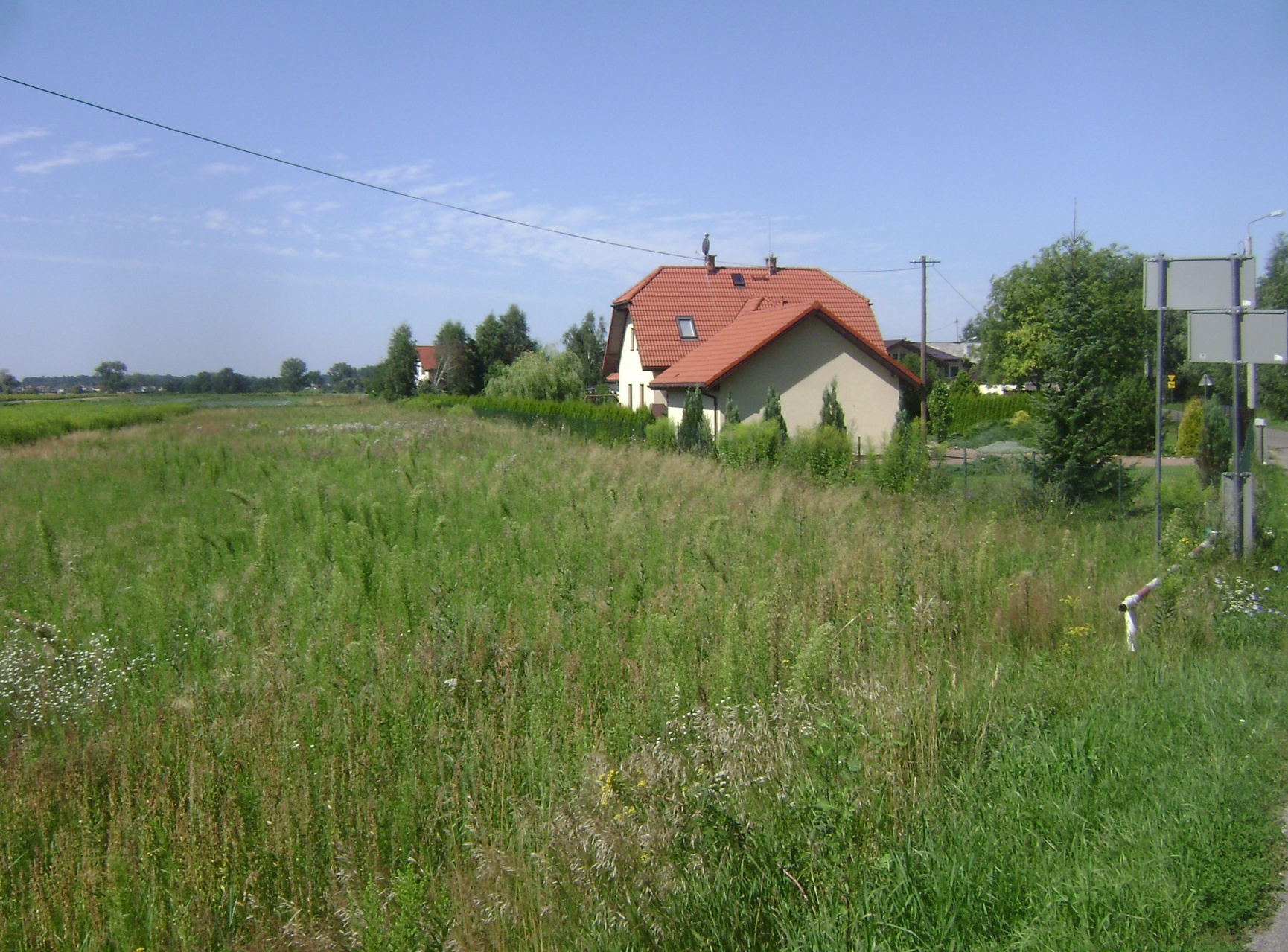

- Location within Poland
- Coordinates: 52°06′30″N 21°07′49″E
- Country: Poland
- Voivodeship: Masovian
- County: Piaseczno
- Gmina: Konstancin-Jeziorna
- Population: 960

Bielawa [bjɛˈlava] is a village located in Poland, in Piaseczno County in the Masovian Voivodeship, just south of the city of Warsaw. The population is 960.

The Bielawski family originated from and owned the village of Bielawa in the 15th century through 17th century.
