= Mancoluto =

Peruvian shaman

Jose Manuel Pineda Vargas (a.k.a. Maestro Mancoluto) is a Peruvian shaman. Vargas is primarily known as the lead shaman for the Ayahuasca retreat center named Chimbre (also Shimbre) located in Puerto Maldonado, Peru. Vargas was featured in the award-winning documentary "Stepping Into the Fire (2011)."

== Background of name ==
According to Vargas: "The name Mancoluto is from the Chavin language, and it represents a person who knows more of what is unknown, he who has a 6th and 7th sense."

== Controversy as a shaman ==
Mancoluto is controversial among the shamanic teachers in that he seeks to lead, more than seeking to heal. Mancoluto claims to be one of only five master shamans in the world and descendant from the legendary Chavin shamanic civilization that existed for 100,000 years in Peru, long before the Incas. Mancoluto is also controversial in that he does not sing the icaros, and instead administers the dosages of medicine, and then sends participants out into the jungle to learn their lessons on their own. He believes that the ayahuasca is only a purgative medicine, and that the San Pedro (Echinopsis pachanoi) is the primary medicine used to teach the participant survival skills.

== Arrest ==
Arrest stemming from the death of Kyle Joseph Nolan, an 18-year-old from Sebastopol, California. Kyle traveled to Peru to take part in Ayahuasca ceremonies and died during his trip. Vargas tried to hide the death and confessed to burying the young American's body (with the help of two others), and was arrested for his role in the crime.
