= Visionseeker =

Book by Hank Wesselman

Visionseeker: Shared Wisdom from the Place of Refuge
- Author: Hank Wesselman
- Language: English
- Series: Spiritwalker trilogy
- Publication date: 2002
- ISBN: 978-1-56170-828-4

Visionseeker: Shared Wisdom from the Place of Refuge (ISBN 978-1-56170-828-4) is the third book in the Spiritwalker trilogy written by Hank Wesselman. The trilogy details a series of out-of-body experiences to a tribal society 5000 years in the future.

== See also ==
- List of works by Hank Wesselman
