= Chakapa =

Rattle constructed of bundled leaves

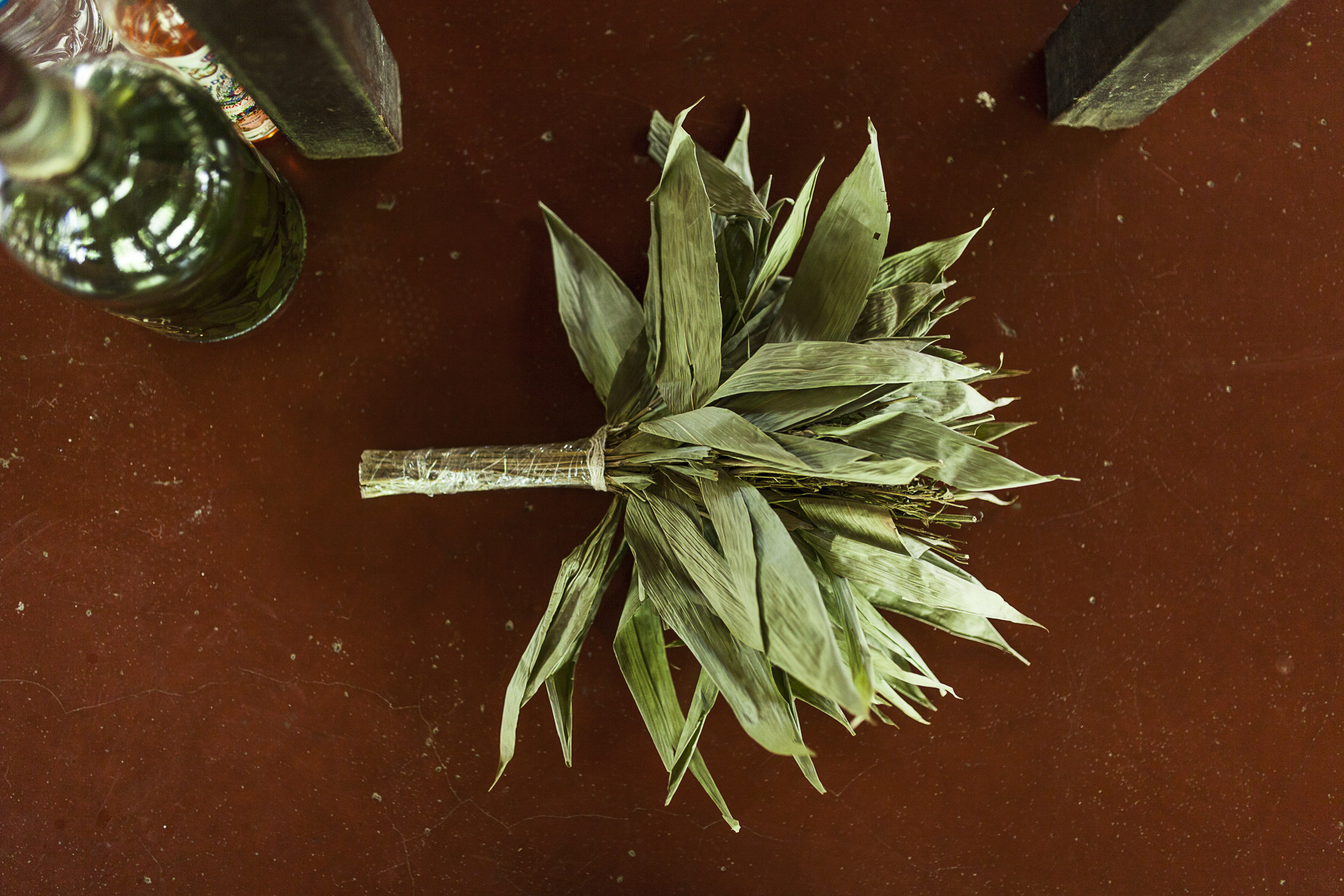
The chakapa used by a Peruvian curandero at Takiwasi Center

Chakapa (sometimes spelled shakapa or Latinized to shacapa) is a Quechua word for a shaker or rattle constructed of bundled leaves. Bushes of the genus Pariana provide the leaves for the chakapa. Chakapa is also the common name for these bushes.

Curanderos (healers) and other shaman of the Shipibo-Conibo people in the Peruvian Amazon use the chakapa in healing ceremonies.

In an ayahuasca ceremony, for example, a curandero may shake the chakapa around the patient while singing an icaro (healing song). The sound of the chakapa is said to comfort patients in an ayahuasca ceremony and "cleanse" the energy surrounding the patient. Shamans have a large variety of chakapa movements that create different sounds and energy waves; these movements match the coinciding icaro and healing that is being done at the time.

Some people report seeing green, blue, and gold ribbons of light form around the chakapa, and then move in tendrils about the room. The chakapa is also an important cleansing tool used during venteadas and arcanas. In the Amazon, once the shaman catches the bad spirits in a chakapa, it is then blown out of the leaves into the forest. The spirits are distributed and taken in by all nature such as trees and plants. A chakapa is made by tying together the leaves from the bush in a fashion that forms a fan shaped instrument. (See picture)

== Folklore ==
The Woodland Cree have a legend about a great hunter named Chakapas. The legend talks about how Chakapas trapped the moon so that it did not shine anymore. Since the brightness of the moon was gone, the Indians had problems with traveling between seasons because they could not see as easily. They begged Chakapas to let the moon go, but Chakapa could not get close enough to the moon to release it. He used the help of mice to set it free. A brave mouse chewed the cords that tied the moon. It left him burned which is the Indians explanation for mice having a light grey belly. The moon was eventually set free and the shadow of Chakapas remains on the moon to this day.
