= Icaro =

Amazonian ritual song

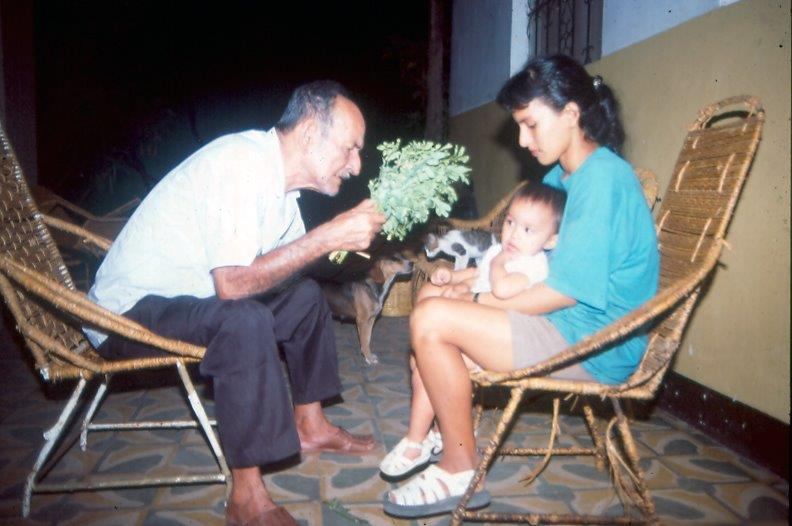
Don Solón Tello singing an icaro to a child in a traditional medicine ritual in the northern Amazon of Peru

Icaro (Quechua: ikaro) is a South American indigenous and mestizo colloquialism for magic song. Today, this term is commonly used to describe the medicine songs performed in vegetal ceremonies, especially by maestros in ayahuasca ceremonies.

Each Amazonian ethnic group has a specific term for this type of generic magical song: for example, eshuva for the Huachipaire people, meye for the Piaroa, mariri for the Kokama, or rao bewá for the Shipibo.

== Etymology ==
The word icaro is believed to derive from the Quechua verb ikaray, which means "to blow smoke in order to heal".

== In healing ceremonies ==
=== Medicine songs ===
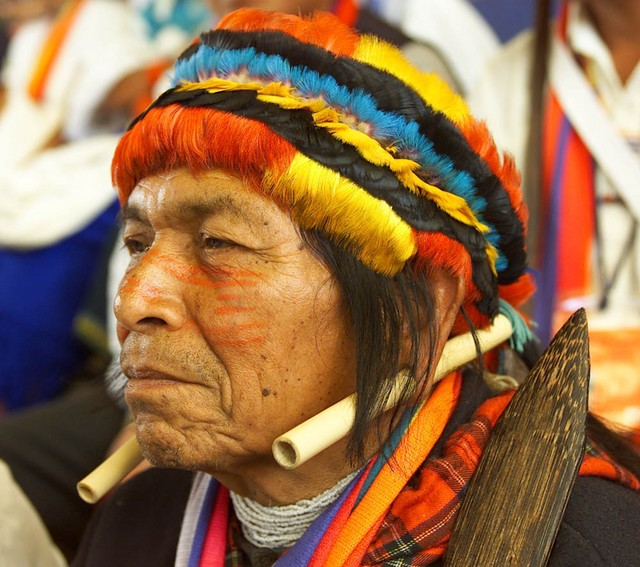
Achuar shaman.

Icaro is most commonly used to describe the medicine songs used by shamans in healing ceremonies, such as with the psychedelic brew ayahuasca. Traditionally, these songs can be performed by whistling, singing with the voice or vocables, or playing an instrument such as the didgeridoo or flute.

Traditionally, icaros may come to a shaman during a ceremony, be passed down from previous lineages of healers, or come to a shaman during a 'dieta' where plant spirits are believed to teach icaros to the shaman directly. The singing or whistling of icaros is sometimes accompanied by a chakapa, a rattle of bundled leaves. Due to the complexity of certain performance techniques, it may take many years to learn certain icaros, and experienced shamans may be able to recite hundreds of them.

== Symbolic and mythological associations ==
In Amazonian cosmology, icaros are sometimes associated with mythological spirits, animals, and elemental forces like the earth or water. Yacumama (Quechua: yaku meaning water, mama meaning mother) is a giant serpent spirit considered the "Mother of Waters" and is believed to live in rivers and lakes as a guardian of aquatic realms. There are only some specific icaros dedicated to Yacumama and the presence of beings such as Yacumama in Amazonian ritual songs demonstrates their influence on icaros.
