= Michael Harner =

American anthropologist and neo-shamanist (1929–2018)

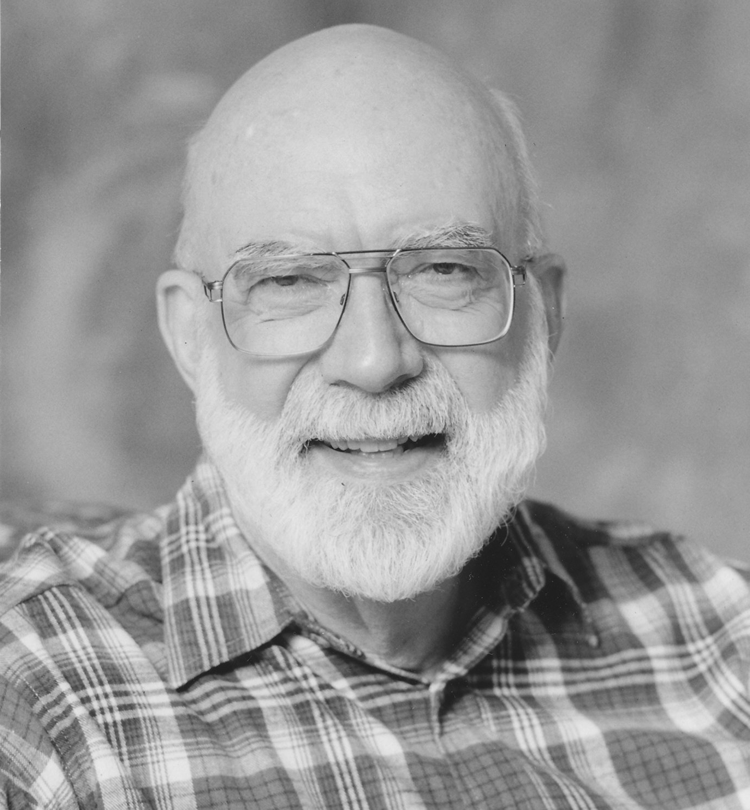
- Born: April 27, 1929; Washington, D.C.
- Died: February 3, 2018 (aged 88)
- Occupations: Anthropologist, educator and author

Michael James Harner (April 27, 1929 – February 3, 2018) was an American anthropologist, educator and author. His 1980 book, The Way of the Shaman: a Guide to Power and Healing, has been foundational in the development and popularization of core shamanism as a New Age path of personal development for adherents of neoshamanism. He also founded the Foundation for Shamanic Studies.

== Career ==
Harner was born in Washington, D.C., in 1929. He initially worked in the field of archaeology, including studying the Lower Colorado River area. As a graduate student in 1956-57 he undertook field research on the culture of the Jívaro (Shuar) people of the Ecuadorian Amazon and began to pursue a career as an ethnologist. His doctoral dissertation, "Machetes, Shotguns, and Society: An Inquiry into the Social Impact of Technological Change among the Jivaro Indians" (U California-Berkeley 1963), became the basis for his book, The Jívaro: People of the Sacred Waterfalls.

In 1960-61 he reported experimenting with the Amazonian plant medicine ayahuasca with the Conibo people of the Peruvian Amazon, which he wrote about in the articles "The Sound of Rushing Water" (1968) and "The Role of Hallucinogenic Plants in European Witchcraft" (1973). Harner returned to the Jívaro in 1964, 1969, and 1973 where he learned the use of the entheogen maikua (Datura brugmansia).

In 1966, having taught at UC-Berkeley and served as associate director of the Lowie Museum of Anthropology, Harner became a visiting professor at Yale and Columbia University and in 1970 joined the graduate faculty of The New School for Social Research in New York City. He co-chaired the Anthropology Section of the New York Academy of Sciences.

In 1983, Harner founded the Center for Shamanic Studies, which is today known as the Foundation for Shamanic Studies. In 1987 Harner left academia to devote himself full-time to the Foundation for Shamanic Studies. Walsh and Grob note in their book, Higher Wisdom: Eminent Elders Explore the Continuing Impact of Psychedelics, "Michael Harner is widely acknowledged as the world's foremost authority on shamanism and has had an enormous influence on both the academic and lay worlds.... What Yogananda did for Hinduism and D. T. Suzuki did for Zen, Michael Harner has done for shamanism, namely bring the tradition and its richness to Western awareness."

He died on February 3, 2018, at the age of 88.

== Development of Core shamanism ==
After traveling to the Amazon where he reported ingesting the hallucinogen ayahuasca, Harner began experimenting with monotonous drumming. In the early 1970s he started giving training workshops to small groups in Connecticut. In 1979 he founded the Center for Shamanic Studies in Norwalk, Connecticut.

In 1980, Harner published The Way of the Shaman: a Guide to Power and Healing, on HarperCollins (a mainstream publisher). In the book he presents his own system of acultural shamanism, called "Core shamanism", which he created, reportedly based on his experiences consuming hallucinogens with Conibo and Jívaro shamans in South America. Harner broadly applied the term "shaman" to diverse spiritual and ceremonial leaders in cultures that do not use this term, claiming that he also studied with "shamans" in North America; he wrote that these were Wintu, Pomo, Coast Salish, and Lakota people, but he did not name any individuals or specific communities. Harner claimed he was describing common elements of "shamanic practice" found among Indigenous people world-wide, in cultures he never encountered, having stripped those elements of specific cultural content so as to render them accessible to contemporary Western spiritual seekers. Influences cited by Harner also included Siberian shamanism, Mexican and Guatemalan culture, and Australian traditions, as well as the familiar spirits of European occultism, which are said to aid the occultist in their metaphysical work. However, his practices do not resemble the religious practices or beliefs of any of these cultures. "Core shamanism" has been met with backlash and criticism from the cultures Harner cited as sources.

Students in the United States and Europe began to take his classes in what he was now calling "core shamanism" (as differenced from traditional, Evenk shamanism, or other Indigenous, ethnic and historical practices that have been referred to as "shamanism" in anthropological texts). Most authors in the field, especially Harner's critics, consider Harner's core shamanism to be the primary influence on, and foundation of, the Neoshamanic movement.

Harner later integrated his Center for Shamanic Studies into the nonprofit Foundation for Shamanic Studies. The Foundation received financial support primarily from the Core Shamanism courses and workshops he taught, supplemented by private donations. From the early 1980s onward, he invited a few of his students to join an international faculty to reach an ever-wider market. In 1987, Harner resigned his professorship to devote himself full-time to the work of the foundation. He largely ceased publishing, except for occasional articles in the publication "Shamanism."

== See also ==
- Carlos Castaneda
- Hank Wesselman

== Bibliography ==
- Harner, Michael, Cave and Cosmos: Shamanic Encounters with Another Reality (North Atlantic Books 2013)
- Harner, Michael (ed,), Hallucinogens and Shamanism (Oxford University Press 1973)
- Harner, Michael, The Jívaro: People of the Sacred Waterfalls (University of California Press 1972)
- Harner, Michael, The Way of the Shaman (HarperOne 1990) Orig. 1980
- Harner, Michael, and Meyer, Alfred, Cannibal. New York: Morrow, 1979. (a novel on Aztecs)
- Harner, Michael, "The Enigma of Aztec Sacrifice." pp. 46–51. Natural History, Vol.86 (no.4), April 1977.
- Haviland, William A., Harald E. L. Prins, Bunny McBride and Dana Walrath, "Anthropologist of Note: Michael J. Harner" Cultural Anthropology: The Human Challenge (14th ed.) (Wadsworth 2013)
