= Eshuva =

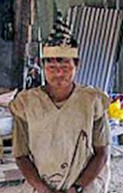
- Stylistic origins: Peruvian music
- Cultural origins: Harákmbut language
- Typical instruments: Human voice

Esuwa, Harakbut sung prayers of Peru’s Wachiperi people
- UNESCO Intangible Cultural Heritage
- Country: Peru
- Reference: 00531
- Region: Latin America and the Caribbean

Inscription history
- Inscription: 2015 (10th session)
- List: Urgent safeguarding

The Eshuva are the Harákmbut-language sung prayers of Peru's Huachipaire people. They are sung as an expression of Huachipaire religious myths to summon nature spirits, to help alleviate illness or promote well-being, as part of traditional ceremonies, and during the initiation of the new Eshuva singers. Eshuva songs are performed without musical accompaniment. Since they are sung only in the Harákmbut language, they help safeguard the Huachipaire people's language, values, and worldview.

Eshuva songs and their function – the ailment they are meant to heal – are transmitted orally. There exist only 12 known singers at present and, as transmission has been interrupted due to the Huachipaire youth's lack of interest, internal migration, and the influence and assimilation of external cultural elements, the songs are at risk of being lost. UNESCO recognized this risk by inscribing Eshuva on the List of Intangible Cultural Heritage in Need of Urgent Safeguarding in 2011. Prior to this, on March 11, 2010, Peru's Ministry of Culture proclaimed the tradition part of the cultural heritage of the Peru.

On November 28, 2011, the Ministry announced steps to help conserve the tradition. "Houses of memory" are to be built as spaces for the practice of Eshuva and other oral traditions. In addition, a recording of Eshuva songs is to be made, with 30 recordings already made.
