= Aleksandr Belyavsky =

Aleksandr Belyavskiy may refer to:

- Aleksandr Belyavsky (actor) (1932–2012), Russian actor
- Aleksandrs Beļavskis (born 1964), Latvian ice hockey player
- Alexander Beliavsky (born 1953), Slovenian chess player of Ukrainian origin
