= Shuar =

Ethnic group of Ecuador

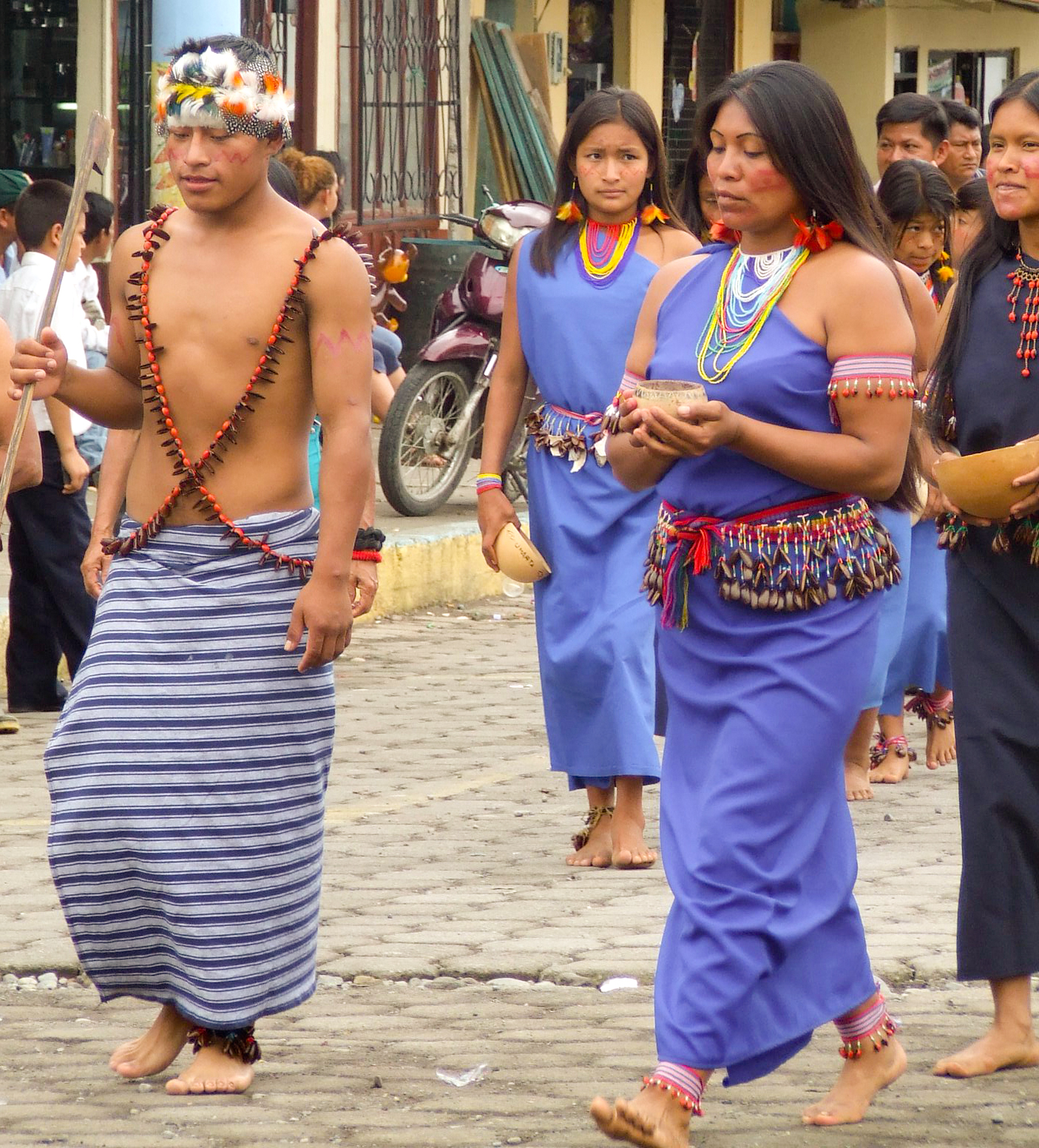

Total population
- 100,000

Languages
- Shuar, Spanish

Religion
- Christianity, Shamanism, Animism

The Shuar, also known as Jivaro, are an indigenous ethnic group that inhabits the Ecuadorian and Peruvian Amazonia. They are famous for their hunting skills and their tradition of head shrinking, known as tsantsa or tzantza.

The Shuar language belongs to the Jivaroan linguistic family and is spoken by over 50,000 people in the region. The Shuar are known for their skill in warfare, both in defending their territories and in offensive actions against external enemies. Currently, many Shuar live in communities organized around agriculture and hunting, although there are also some who work in mining and the timber industry.

== Name ==
Shuar, in the Shuar language, means "people". The people who speak the Shuar language live in tropical rainforest between the upper mountains of the Andes, and in the tropical rainforests and savannas of the Amazonian lowlands, in Ecuador. Shuar live in various places — thus, the muraiya (hill) Shuar are people who live in the foothills of the Andes; the achu (swamp-palm) Shuar (or Achuar) are people who live in the wetter lowlands east of the Andes (Ecuador).

Shuar refer to Spanish-speakers as apach, and to non-Spanish and non-Shuar speakers as inkis. Europeans and European Americans used to refer to Shuar as "jívaros" or "jíbaros"; this word probably derives from the 16th century Spanish spelling of shuar (see Gnerre 1973), but has taken other meanings including "savage"; outside of Ecuador, jibaro has come to mean "rustic", and in Puerto Rico to describe a self-sufficient farmer. The Shuar are popularly depicted in a wide variety of travelogue and adventure literature because of Western fascination with their former practice of shrinking human heads (tsantsa).

== Social organization and contacts with Europeans ==
From the time of first contact with Europeans in the 16th century, to the formation of the Shuar Federation in the 1950s and 1960s, Shuar were semi-nomadic and lived in separate households dispersed in the rainforest, linked by the loosest of kin and political ties, and lacking corporate kin-groups or centralized or institutionalized political leadership.

The center of Shuar life was a relatively autonomous household consisting of a husband, his wives (usually two), unmarried sons, and daughters. Upon marriage sons would leave their natal household, and sons-in-law would move in (see matrilocal residence). Men hunted and wove clothes; women gardened. In 1527, the Shuar defeated an incursion by the Inca armies of Huayna Capac.

When Shuar first made contact with Spaniards in the 16th century, they entered into peaceful trade relations. They violently resisted Spanish attempts to illegally tax them, and drove the Spaniards away in 1599.

Colonization and missionization in the 20th century have forced the Shuar to reorganize themselves into nucleated settlements called centros. Centros were initially impressed due to evangelization by Catholic missionaries but also became a means to defend Shuar land claims against those of settlers. In 1964 representatives of Shuar centros formed a political federation to protect their interests from the Ecuadorian state, non-governmental organizations, and transnational corporations.

== Tsantsa, the shrunken heads ==
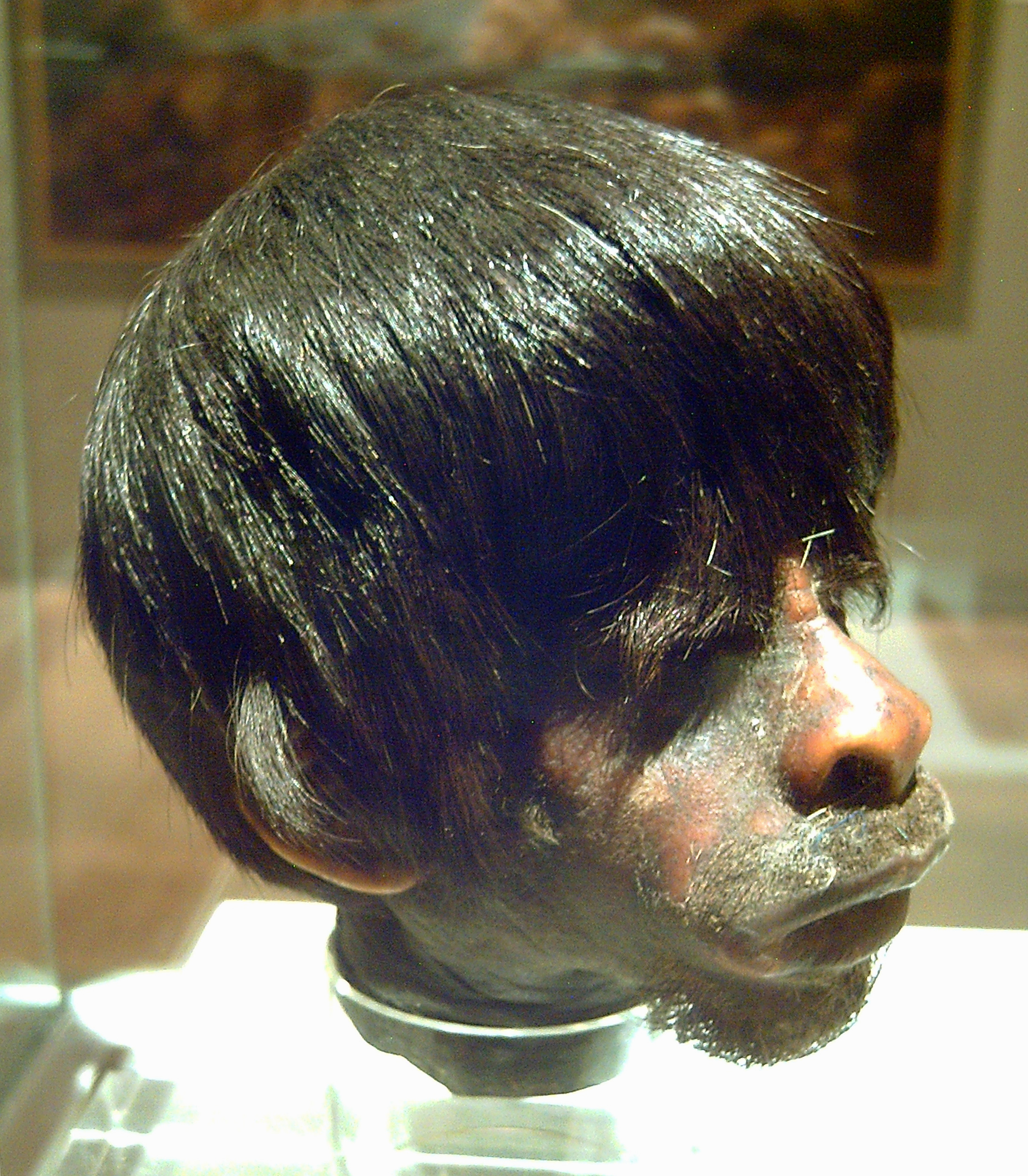
A shrunken head exhibited at the Museum of the Americas in Madrid.

In the 19th century muraiya Shuar became famous among Europeans and Euro-Americans for their elaborate process of shrinking the heads of slain Achuar. Although non-Shuar characterized these shrunken heads (tsantsa) as trophies of warfare, Shuar insisted that they were not interested in the heads themselves and did not value them as trophies. Instead, they sought the muisak, or soul of the victim, which was contained in and by the shrunken head. Shuar men believed that control of the muisak would enable them to pass the soul's power to their wives' and daughters' which would aid them in their labor.

Since women cultivated manioc and made chicha (manioc beer), which together provided the bulk of calories and carbohydrates in the Shuar diet, women's labor was crucial to Shuar biological and social life. In the late 19th century and early 20th century Europeans and Euro-Americans began trading manufactured goods, including shotguns, asking in return for shrunken heads. The result was an increase in local warfare, including head hunting, that has contributed to the perception of the Shuar as violent. In 1961 Edmundo Bielawski made the only footage showing what appears to be their head-shrinking process.

== Adulthood rituals ==
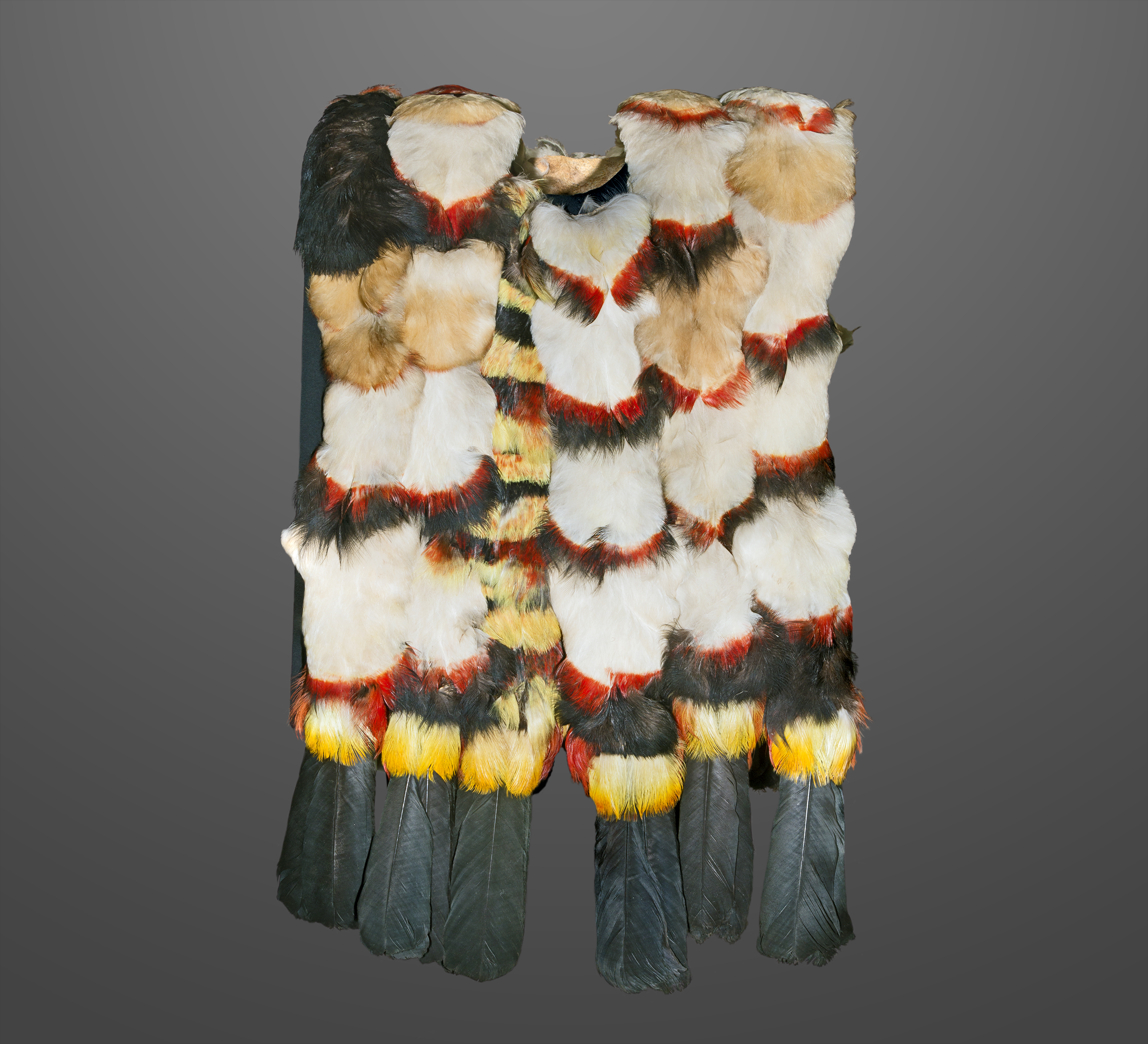
Tunic in toucan feather MHNT

Prior to missionization in the 1940s and 1950s Shuar culture functioned to organize and promote a warrior society. Boys of about eight years would be taken by their fathers or uncles on a three- to five-day journey to a nearby waterfall, during which time the boy would drink only tobacco water. At some point the child would be given maikua (Datura arborea, Solanaceae), in the hope that he would then see momentary visions, or arútam. These visions were believed to be produced by a wakaní or ancestral spirit.

If the boy was brave enough he could touch the arútam, and acquire the arútam wakaní. This would make the boy very strong, and possession of several arútam wakaní would make the boy invincible. Shuar, however, believed that they could easily lose their arútam wakaní, and thus repeated this ritual several times.

A Shuar warrior who had lived to kill many people was called a kakáram. Shuar believed that if a person in possession of an arútam wakaní died a peaceful death, they would give birth to a new wakaní; if someone in possession of an arútam wakaní were killed, they would give birth to a muísak.

== Illness and shamanism ==
Shuar generally do not believe in natural death, although they recognize that certain epidemics such as measles and scarlet fever are diseases introduced through contact with Europeans or Euro-Americans. They fought primarily with spears and blowguns, but—like many other groups in the region—also believed that they could be killed by tsentsak, invisible darts.

Any unexplained death was attributed to such tsentsak. Although tsentsak are animate, they do not act on their own. Shamans (uwishin) are people who possess and control tsentsak. To possess tsentsak they must buy them from other shamans; Shuar believe that the most powerful shamans are Quichua-speakers, who live to the north and east.

To control tsentsak, Shuar must ingest natem (Ayahuasca). Many Shuar believe that illness is caused when someone hires a shaman to shoot tsentsak into the body of an enemy. This attack occurs in secret and few if any shamans admit to doing this. If someone becomes ill they may go to a shaman for diagnosis and treatment.

Shuar have many plants that they use for common everyday illnesses. Most people know these plants and how to prepare and use them. Occasionally, an older woman will be asked for advice or help especially with fertility control, childbirth and new infants. Piripiri (Cyperus species) are used for a variety of ailments.

== Shuar and the Ecuadorian state ==
The discovery of oil in the upper Amazon has motivated Ecuadorian and Peruvian interest in the region. In the 20th century Ecuadorian Shuar and Peruvian groups like the Achuar have had significantly different histories.

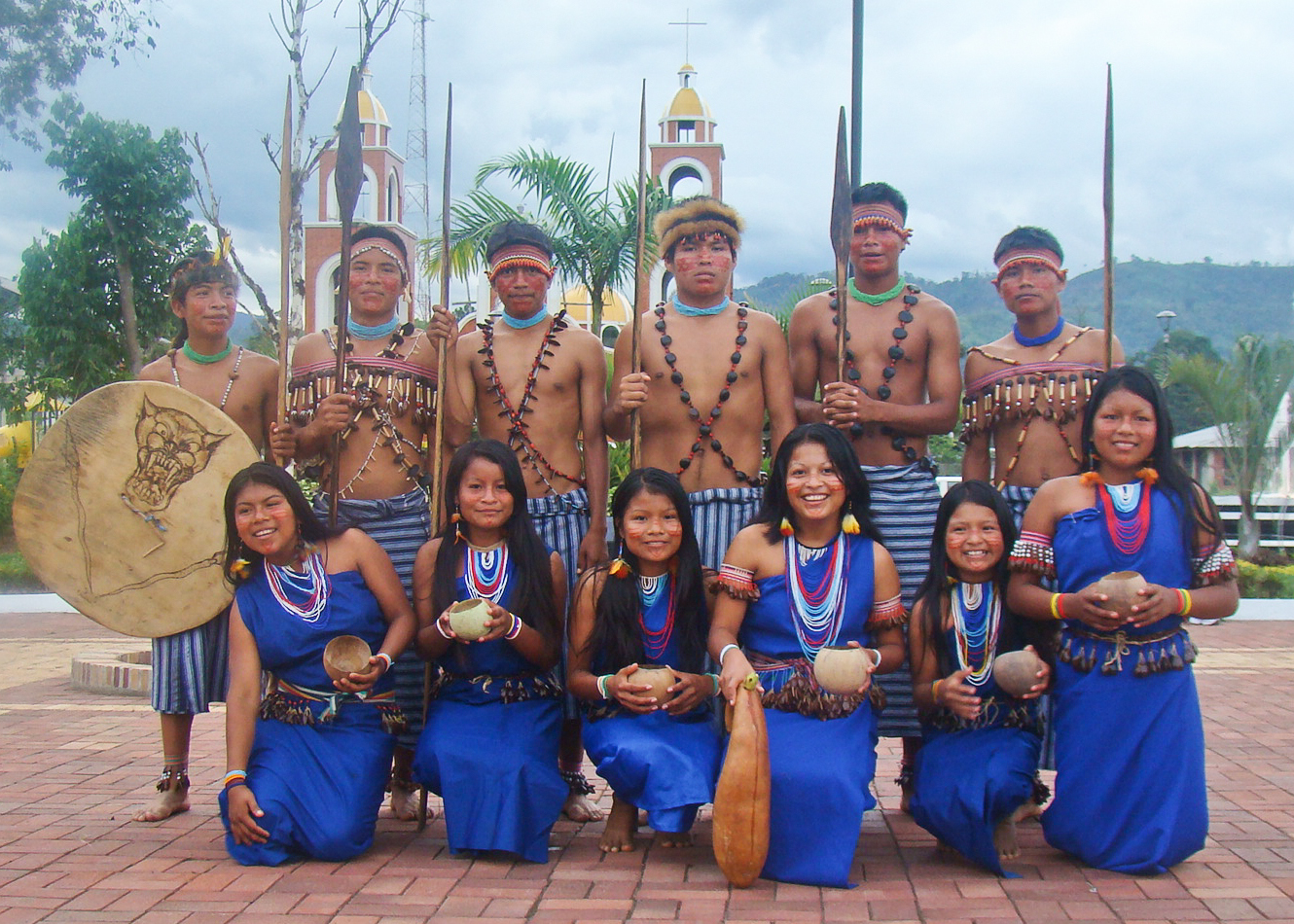
Shuar in Logroño, Ecuador.

There are at least 40,000 Shuar, 5,000 Achuars and 700 Shiwiars in Ecuador.

At the end of the 19th century Catholic Jesuits re-established missions among the Shuar, and poor and landless Euro-Ecuadorians from the highlands (colonos) began to settle among Shuar. Shuar entered into peaceful trade relations, exchanged land for manufactured goods, and began sending their children to mission boarding schools to learn Spanish. In 1935 the Ecuadorian government created a Shuar reserve, in part to regulate Euro-Ecuadorian access to land, and gave Salesian (Catholic) missionaries charge over the reserve.

Missionaries were largely successful in acculturating the Shuar, teaching them Spanish, converting them to Christianity, discouraging them from warfare, the production of shrunken heads, the puberty rites through which Shuar acquired an arútam wakaní, and encouraging them to participate in the market economy. They were largely but not completely successful in encouraging Shuar to abandon polygyny for monogamy. They were relatively unsuccessful in discouraging the practice of shamanism.

By the 1950s Shuar had lost a considerable amount of land to settlers. At this time they abandoned their semi-nomadic and dispersed settlement pattern and began to form nucleated settlements of 5 to 30 families, called centros (Spanish for "centers"). These centros facilitated missionary access to Shuar. They also provided a basis for Shuar petitions to the Ecuadorian government for land; in return Shuar promised to clear rainforest to convert to pasture, and the government provided loans for Shuar to buy cattle which they would raise for market.

In the 1960s Salesian missionaries encouraged leaders of the centros to meet and form a new organization. In 1964 they formed the Federación Interprovincial de Centros Shuar-Achuar ("Interprovincial Federation of Shuar and Achuar Centros"; many Achuar live in Ecuador, although most live in Peru). The Federation is democratic and hierarchically organized, most of its leaders are salaried by the Ecuadorian state.

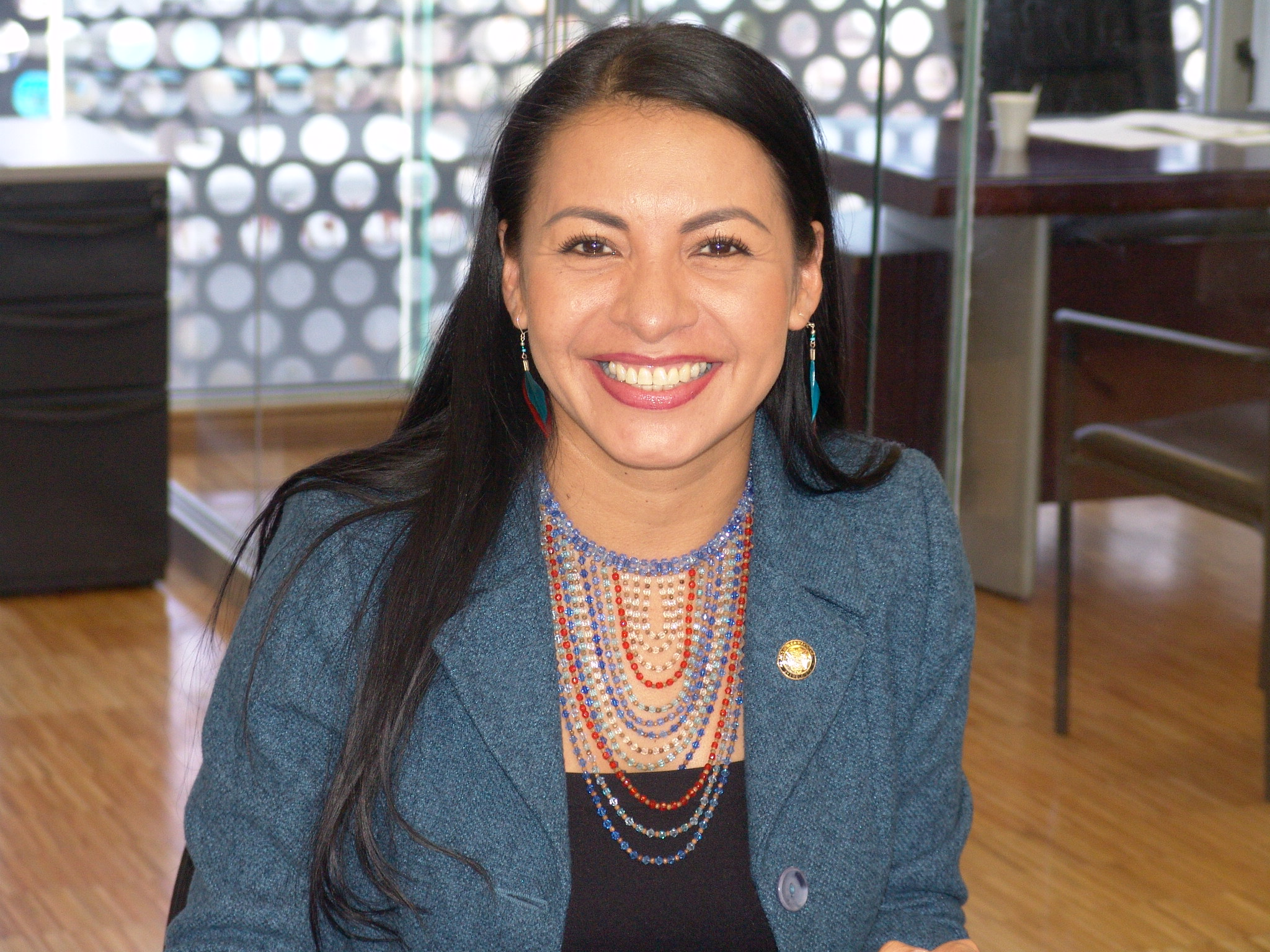
Diana Atamaint, Ecuadorian Shuar politician

In 1969 the Federation signed an accord with the Ecuadorian government in which the Federation assumed administrative jurisdiction over the Shuar reserve. The Federation assumed the duties of educating children, administering civil registration and land-tenure, and promoting cattle-production and other programs meant to further incorporate Shuar into the market economy. Later, the Federation splintered into several groups, including a separate Achuar Federation, although the groups maintain cordial relations.

Thanks to the work of the Federation, Shuar identity is very strong. Most Shuar also identify strongly to the Ecuadorian nation-state and have entered Ecuadorian electoral politics.

In the last few years, conflict emerged as result of mining projects in the provinces of Morona Santiago and Zamora Chinchipe

On 20 November 2018, Diana Atamaint, a Shuar woman, became the president of the National Electoral Council.

== Jungle Commands Group (Iwias) ==
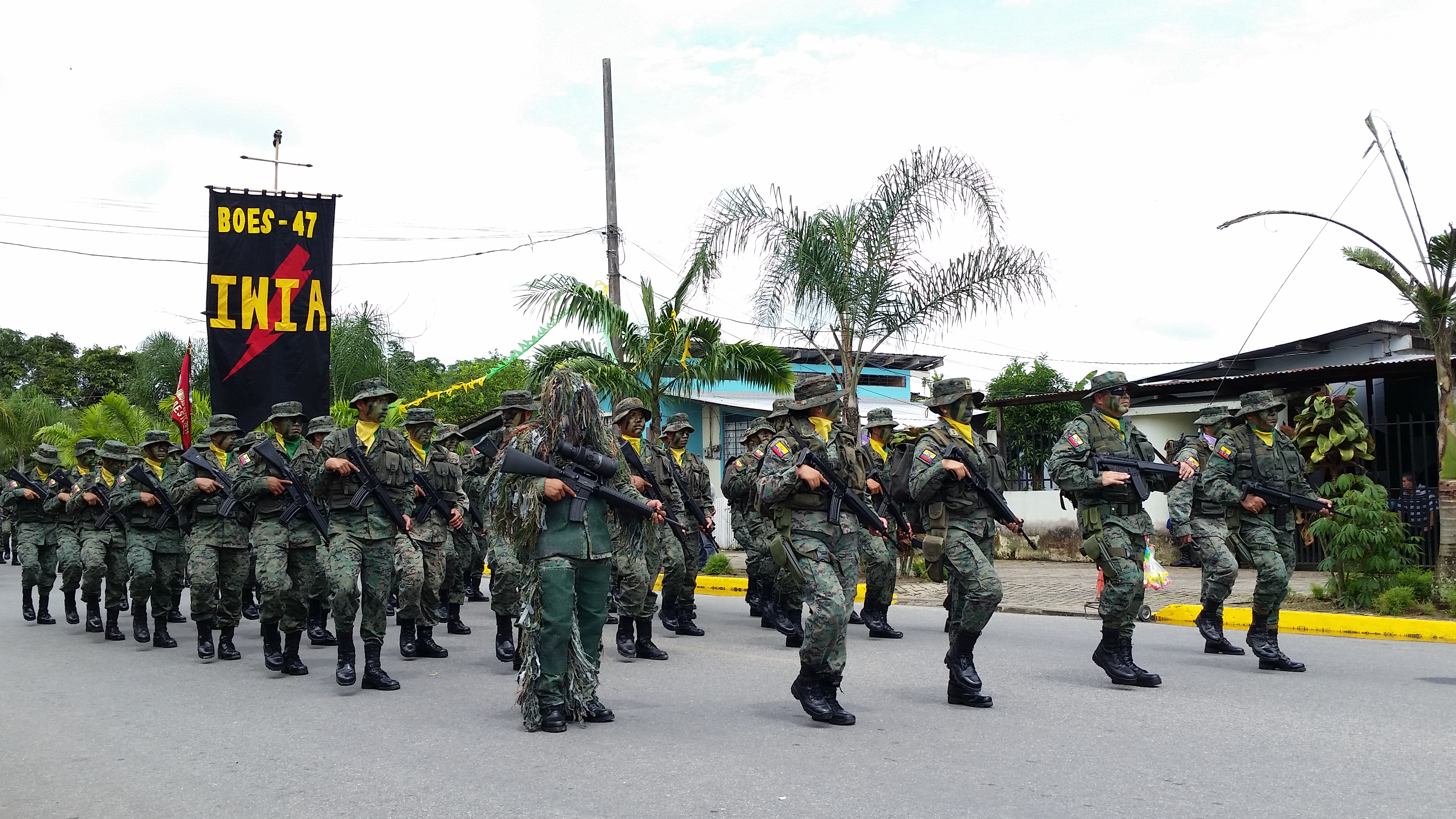
Soldiers of the Jungle Commands Group Iwias parading in Tena

Many Shuar also serve in the Ecuadorian Army, and the Army has appropriated the perception of Shuar as "fierce warriors", forming elite "Iwia" units of Shuar soldiers (although all commissioned officers are non-Shuar). These units distinguished themselves in the 1995 Cenepa War between Ecuador and Peru. The name Iwia means "Jungle Demon"; it comes from the Shuar mythology: the Iwia is a feared demon that devours people.The motto of IWIAS is "Never defeated".

EWIAS (Escuela de Iwias Crnl. Gonzalo Barragán) is the entity in charge of training indigenous people from the Amazon region. Located in Shell, Pastaza Province, around 35 Iwia soldiers graduate from this school annually.

== In popular culture ==
- In James Rollins' novel Amazonia, Dr. Favre's Shuar mistress, Tshui, is described as a "witch" who concocts poisons, brews psychoactive tea, and maintains a large collection of shrunken heads. Her process of shrinking one such trophy, which she wears around her neck, is described in great detail.
- Luis Sepúlveda's 1989 novel The Old Man Who Read Love Stories explores the Shuar people and their culture/traditions/beliefs as the main character is adopted/befriended by their people. The author was close friends with a Shuar union leader and built aspects of the story around the stories he told him about his way of life.
- In the film Back from Eternity (1956) the Shuar (called Jivaros in film) attack the stranded crew in an unnamed South American country.

== See also ==
- Jivaroan peoples
