= Beyond the Gates of Splendor =

- Directed by: Jim Hanon
- Written by: Jim Hanon
- Produced by: Brent Ryan Green; Mart Green; Kevin McAfee
- Starring: Mincaye; Elisabeth Elliot; Frank Drown; Steve Saint
- Narrated by: Steve Saint
- Cinematography: Robert Fraisse
- Edited by: Miles Hanon
- Music by: Ronald Owen
- Distributed by: Every Tribe Entertainment
- Release date: September 27, 2002
- Running time: 96 minutes
- Country: United States
- Language: English
- Box office: $36,412 (US box office total)

Beyond the Gates of Splendor (also Beyond the Gates) is a documentary film that was released in 2002. It chronicles the events leading up to and following Operation Auca, an attempt to contact the Huaorani tribe of Ecuador in which five American missionaries were killed. The film was produced by Bearing Fruit Productions and distributed by Every Tribe Entertainment.

== Inspiration ==
The title of the film references Elisabeth Elliot's 1957 bestseller, Through Gates of Splendor. First published in 1957, the book told the original story of the five martyred missionaries. A low budget documentary film was also produced with the same name in 1967. One year after Gates was published, the first successful peaceful contact with the Huaorani tribe was made. In the years that followed, many Huaos were converted to Christianity and changed their lifestyle. Therefore, Beyond the Gates recounts the unfolding story up unto the present day. The film also included new information that has since come out about the Palm Beach Massacre through communication with the Indigenous people.

Beyond the Gates was very influential in the production of the drama film End of the Spear, which was released four years later. Many of the same events recounted by the Huaorani interviewees in Beyond the Gates were depicted dramatically in End of the Spear.

== Filming ==
The film was shot on location in Ecuador; Ocala, Florida; Seattle, Washington; and at Wheaton College. There were also interviews from all five widows (two years before both Marilou McCully and Marj Saint died), members of the search party and members of the Huaorani tribe.

The crew spent 17 days in the jungle to interview members of the Huaorani tribe.

=== Interviewees ===
The Five Widows:

- Marj Saint Van Der Puy, widow of Nate Saint
- Barbara Youderian, widow of Roger Youderian
- Olive Fleming Liefeld, widow of Pete Fleming
- Marilou McCully, widow of Ed McCully
- Elisabeth Elliot Gren, widow of Jim Elliot

The Saint Family:

- Steve Saint, son of Nate Saint
- Kathy Saint Drown, daughter of Nate Saint
- Rachel Saint, sister of Nate Saint
- Jesse Saint, son of Steve Saint
- Jaime Saint, son of Steve Saint
- Ginny Saint, wife of Steve Saint

Indians:

- Carmela, a Quechua Indian who lived in Arajuno
- Mincaye
- Kimo
- Ompodae
- Dayuma
- Paa
- Dawa
- Tementa

Others:

- Dave Howard, brother of Elisabeth Elliot
- Frank Drown, missionary colleague of Roger Youderian and member of the search party, part Avant Ministries (formerly Gospel Missionary Union)
- Col. Malcolm Nurnberg, leader of the search party
- Clayton Robarchek, anthropologist
- Carole Robarchek, anthropologist
- Valerie Elliot Shepard, daughter of Jim Elliot

== Awards ==
The film won the Crystal Heart Award at the Heartland Film Festival in 2002. It also won the Audience Award at the Palm Beach International Film Festival in 2004 for Best Documentary Feature.
