= List of Moody Bible Institute people =

This is a list of people affiliated with Moody Bible Institute as officers, faculty, alumni, or liaisons.

== Presidents ==
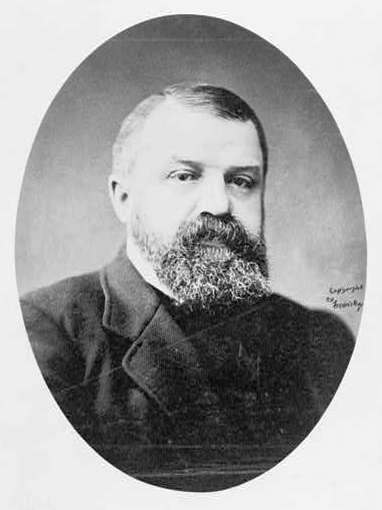
Dwight L. Moody

- Dwight L. Moody (1887–1899)
- Reuben Archer Torrey (1899–1904)
- James M. Gray (1904–1934)
- William Henry Houghton (1934–1947)
- William Culbertson III (1948–1971)
- George Sweeting (1971–1987)
- Joseph M. Stowell, III (1987–2005)
- Michael J. Easley (2005–2008)
- J. Paul Nyquist (2009–2018)
- Greg Thornton (interim president) (2018)
- Mark Jobe (2019-2026)
- Rick Melson (2026- )

== Alumni and faculty ==
- Walter Banek – alumnus; bishop of the Reformed Episcopal Church
- Paul Benware – faculty; pastor, author and former professor of Bible and theology
- Mary McLeod Bethune – alumnus; the daughter of former South Carolina slaves, McLeod Bethune also graduated from Scotia Seminary for Girls before starting a school for girls in Florida which has become Bethune-Cookman University; She became an advisor to U.S. presidents Calvin Coolidge, Herbert Hoover, Franklin D. Roosevelt and Harry S. Truman. Outside of her work as a presidential advisor, McLeod Bethune was on the National Urban League Executive Board, president of Southeastern Federation of Women's Clubs, president of the National Association of Colored Women, president of National Association of Teachers in Colored Schools, founder and president of the National Council of Negro Women and participated in the Interracial Council of America.
- Solomon Birnbaum – faculty. While it is unclear to what extent Birnbaum's full role had been and for how long the doctor was at MBI, he did teach at least one Hebrew class at the institute in 1923, with a former graduate of the course sitting behind Birnbaum in a photo. At the time, what Birnbaum had taught had been part of, "the only Jewish missions course in the world."
- David Brickner – alumnus; executive director of Jews for Jesus (currently)
- Mark I. Bubeck – alumnus; pastor and author, among his books are "The Adversary" and "Overcoming the Adversary"
- Marie Chapian – alumnus; author, speaker and psychotherapist
- Gary Chapman – alumnus; pastor, international speaker, author of numerous books including, "The 5 Love Languages" book series
- Samuel Coffman – alumnus; Canadian bishop and peace activist
- Robert A. Cook – alumnus; pastor, author and former president of The King's College (New York); former president of the National Association of Evangelicals; former president of the National Religious Broadcasters; co-founder and former president of Youth for Christ International; former president of the Moody Alumni Association; former vice-president of Scripture Press, in Wheaton, Illinois
- Cisco Cotto - alumnus; pastor; faculty; Chicago radio host
- John Adelbert Davis – alumnus; evangelist, educator and founder of Practical Bible College, now called, "Davis College"
- Mikel Del Rosario - faculty, apologist, author of Did Jesus Really Say He Was God? Making Sense of His Historical Claims (IVP Academic), host of The Apologetics Guy Show podcast.
- Peter Deyneka – alumnus; author, missionary to the Russian diaspora; With a group of like-minded men, Deyneka founded what became the Slavic Gospel Association, in 1949.
- C. Fred Dickason – alumnus; faculty; pastor, author, lecturer and former chairman of MBI's department of theology, Dickason distinguished himself as a foremost authority on angelology, demonology and the occult. He was also named "Outstanding Educator in America" and is a member of the Evangelical Theological Society.
- Bart D. Ehrman – alumnus: earned Moody's then-unaccredited three-year diploma in 1976. Though initially a born-again—even fundamentalist – Evangelical Christian, he later became a liberal/progressive one for 15 years before finally describing himself as an agnostic as a result of his struggles with the philosophical problems of evil and suffering. Focusing on Biblical textual criticism, Ehrman is a leading scholar of the New Testament, the historical Jesus and the development of early Christianity, having written and/or edited over 30 books, including three college textbooks and six New York Times bestsellers. He is the James A. Gray, Distinguished Professor of New Testament at the University of North Carolina at Chapel Hill.
- William Evans – alumnus; faculty; author, Bible teacher and the institute's first graduate, in 1892. As a young man, a new Christian convert and a new immigrant to America who was earning a good salary, he attended one of D.L. Moody's preaching engagements in New York City; and, after appealing to men in the audience to give their lives to Christian service, Moody directly looked at Evans and said with uncommon insight, "Young man, I mean you." After the meeting, Moody and Evans had a further conversation where it was said Moody told the reportedly conflicted Evans, "Young man, pack up your trunk and go to my school in Chicago." The two men quibbled some more, since Evans had already been wrestling for weeks, alone, about his service for God. However, Evans went to Chicago. Though his time there was not without its trials, he did graduate with the first official Institute diploma. Evans was later appointed director of the Department of the Bible at the institute. At some points in his life, Evans memorized the entire King James Version of the Bible and the entire New Testament of the American Standard Version of the Bible.
- Daniel Everett – alumnus; has since converted to atheism; educator, currently the dean of Arts and Sciences at Bentley University, in Waltham, Massachusetts; former chair of the Department of Languages, Literatures and Cultures at Illinois State University
- George L. Fox – alumnus; U.S. Army first lieutenant and chaplain; one of the "Four Chaplains" who gave his life to save his shipmates on their torpedoed armed forces transport ship, the SS Dorchester, during World War II; Fox and the other chaplains were honored posthumously with Distinguished Service Crosses and, in 1948, were honored with commemorative three-cent stamps for their heroism
- Louis Goldberg – faculty; author and former professor of Theology and Jewish Studies; former president of the Evangelical Theological Society, in 1983; former scholar-in-residence for Jews for Jesus; after Goldberg's death, Jews for Jesus named its New York City library in Goldberg's honor; a scholarship has been set-up at MBI in Goldberg's name for one student of good standing who is a Jewish studies major of promise to the work of evangelizing Jewish communities worldwide
- Michael Guido – alumnus; evangelist, known later in life for his "Seeds from the Sower" television sermonettes and his faith-based ministry in Metter, Georgia. As part of an MBI Extension Department team in his early years, Guido went to many American military bases and held evangelistic meetings and handed out New Testaments to soldiers. This ministry earned him and the team a commendation from then Secretary of the Navy Frank Knox, under President Franklin D. Roosevelt.
- Donald Hustad – faculty; musician, composer, author, scholar and critic of evangelical church music.
- Harry A. Ironside – faculty; taught Bible studies, evangelism and Christian service through MBI's Extension Department; Ironside was also the senior pastor at Chicago's Moody Church for 18 years.
- Jerry B. Jenkins – alumnus; author, publisher and former writer-at-large at the institute; co-authored the "Left Behind" series of Christian novels with Pastor Tim LaHaye; Jenkins was formerly board chairman of the executive committee for the MBI trustees
- Clarence W. Jones – alumnus; musician; along with his wife and Christian & Missionary Alliance missionaries and co-founders Reuben Larson, D. Stuart Clark, John Clark, Paul Young and their missionary wives began radio broadcasting from call letters "HCJB" – "The Voice of the Andes" – in Quito, Ecuador, South America. HCJB was the first Christian missionary radio station in the world.
- Vincent James Joy – alumnus; pioneer missionary to the Ahtna people of interior Alaska and the founder of Alaska Bible College.
- Isobel Kuhn – alumnus; author, missionary with her Moody grad husband, John, to the Burmese Lisu people in the mountainous Yunnan Province of southwestern China
- Mary L. Moreland (1859-1918) — alumnus; minister, evangelist, suffragist, author
- Meghan O'Gieblyn - writer on religion and technology
- Francisco Olazabal- Pentecostal evangelic healer and founder of Concilio Latino Americano de Iglesias Cristianas (CLADIC) and Founder of Asamblea De Iglesias Cristianas (AIC) attended one semester in 1911.
- Marilou (Hobolth) McCully – alumnus; missionary wife of Ed McCully, who was martyred along with Nate Saint, Pete Fleming, Roger Youderian and Jim Elliot, by the Huaorani people, during "Operation Auca," in the jungles of Ecuador, South America, on January 8, 1956
- Jonathan McReynolds – Grammy winning gospel musician who studied online for his Master’s degree in Biblical Studies from Moody Theological Seminary in 2015.
- Irwin A. Moon – alumnus; pastor, worked through the auspices of MBI with his, "Sermons from Science." A number of years later he worked through the Moody Institute of Science, in California, producing Moody science films, which now are on DVD.
- Ed Pawlowski – alumnus; mayor of Allentown, Pennsylvania (2006–2018)
- Arthur W. Pink – alumnus; pastor and author, although having only attended MBI for eight weeks, Pink became a respected preacher and prolific theological author through his personal study of the Scriptures
- Wess Stafford – alumnus; radio host, author and president emeritus of Compassion International
- John and Betty Stam – alumni; a young, American missionary couple who were martyred in China by the Communist revolutionary forces sweeping the country, on Dec. 8, 1934
- Louis Talbot - alumnus; 2nd and 4th President of Biola University (1932-1935, 1938-1952), pastor of Calvary Memorial Church, pastor of Church of the Open Door, eponym of Talbot School of Theology, author.
- Maynard W. Tollberg – alumnus; U.S. Navy Reserve, watertender second class; scalded and almost blinded after an enemy torpedo hit the Navy Destroyer he was on during World War II, the USS La Vallette (DD-448); Tollberg climbed over dead bodies to shut off an oil valve, which saved a number of his shipmates' lives; he was posthumously honored with a Navy Cross; and, a Navy transport ship, the USS Tollberg, was commissioned in his honor for his heroism
- Daniel B. Towner – faculty; former music department director who is credited with doing the most for the MBI music department in its early days; Towner wrote, or collaborated in writing, 2,000 Christian hymns in his lifetime
- George Verwer, founder of Operation Mobilisation and author of several books, including Messiology : the mystery of how God works even when it doesn't make sense to us. Chicago: Moody Publishers. 2016. ISBN 978-0-8024-1485-4. OCLC 940796125.
- Tim Walberg – alumnus; manager, pastor and current U.S. Congressman from Michigan; Walberg also served in the Michigan House of Representatives from 1983 to 1999
- John H. Walton – faculty; author and former professor of Old Testament
- Lula Ethridge Wardlow – alumnus; United Methodist minister; first female mayor in the Town of Montgomery, Louisiana (1926–1930)
- Gary Wilde – alumnus; author and Episcopal priest
- Kenneth Wuest – faculty; author and former professor of New Testament Greek

== Others associated with MBI ==
- William Whiting Borden – trustee; although he died at age 25, Borden graduated from Yale, started the Yale Hope Mission while an undergraduate there and then graduated from Princeton Theological Seminary; he pledged almost all of his approximately $1,000,000 fortune to missions and was training to become a missionary to China when he died of cerebral meningitis (According to this author, Borden was not related to the milk family. His father was a lawyer, and his grandfather was in Chicago real estate.)
- Nathaniel S. Bouton – original trustee; organized and incorporated the Union Foundry Works, which was "one of most prominent" manufacturers of industrial steel "in the west"; former superintendent of public works in Chicago, who was the first superintendent to pave the city's streets
- Henry Parsons Crowell – trustee president; an industrialist who was the president and CEO of the Quaker Oats Company and a philanthropist (Crowell Trust); he guided MBI for 40 years, starting in 1904
- Sir William Dobbie – British lieutenant general; associated with the Second Boer War, World War I and World War II; in 1945, for three months Dobbie and his wife testified of their Christian faith across the United States and to the First Lady at the time, Eleanor Roosevelt, under the auspices of MBI
- John V. Farwell – original trustee; dry goods salesman, vice-president of the Chicago Board of Trade and presidential elector on the Lincoln ticket, in 1860
- T.W. Harvey – original trustee and first trustee vice-president; lumber dealer and banker; founded Harvey, Illinois
- Harry A. Ironside – one of the many evangelists who participated somewhere around the U.S. (48 states at the time), or in the British Isles, in MBI's 1936-'37 50th-anniversary celebration of the institute and the 100th-year birthday celebration for D.L. Moody
- Elbridge G. Keith – original trustee and treasurer; banker and former president of Chicago Title and Trust Company
- Howard Atwood Kelly – trustee; noted gynecologist and surgeon and one of the four founding staff members/-professors of Johns Hopkins Hospital, in Baltimore, Maryland
- Cyrus H. McCormick, Jr. – original trustee; perfected and patented his father's reaper invention which harvested field crops; this revolutionized farming worldwide; however, almost 20 years later, the U.S. Patent and Trademark Office legally ruled that the McCormicks' invention was not the first crop-harvesting reaper invented in the U.S.; McCormick Harvesting Machine Company was founded, which eventually became International Harvester through a merger with Deering Harvester Company and three smaller companies; then, McCormick's company became part of Case IH (JI Case), their former parent corporation, together, being Tenneco; but, as of 2013, the assets of International Harvester and Case Corporation are currently owned by the agricultural division of CNH Industrial, an American-Italian company based in the UK
- Robert S. Scott – original trustee; dry goods salesman who eventually became the senior partner of Carson Pirie Scott, now billing itself as, "Carson's."
- Mel Trotter – one of the many evangelists who participated somewhere around the U.S. (48 states at the time), or in the British Isles, in MBI's 1936-'37 50th-anniversary celebration of the institute and 100th-year birthday celebration for D.L. Moody
- Cecilia Tshabalala – alumnus, South African women's rights activist and clubwoman
