= Indigenous People's Technology and Education Center =

I-TEC - Indigenous People's Technology and Education Center
- Abbreviation: I-TEC
- Formation: 1996
- Type: 501(c)(3) not-for-profit
- Location: Dunnellon, Florida
- Founder: Steve Saint
- Website: https://www.itecusa.org

Indigenous People's Technology and Education Center (I-TEC) is a 501(c)(3) not-for-profit Christian missionary organization located in Dunnellon, Florida. Founded by Steve Saint, the stated purpose of I-TEC is to empower indigenous churches to overcome the technological and educational hurdles that stand in the way of their independence."

== History ==
I-TEC was founded by Steve Saint, son of missionary Nate Saint, as a result of his experiences living among the Huaorani in the Amazon rainforest in Ecuador, near Shell Mera. In 1996, 18 months after moving to the tribal village at the request of the Huaorani elders, including Mincaye, to guide their interactions with the outside world, Saint moved back to the United States, so as to prevent the tribe from becoming detrimentally dependent on him. Upon his return to the United States, he founded I-TEC with the ambition to develop solutions to the economic and cultural crises that the Huaorani and many other tribal cultures face, using technology that indigenous people can operate and maintain with minimal outside support.

== Indigenous Training Programs ==
I-TEC developed and currently uses numerous training programs and products to train and equip indigenous Christ-followers. The model of training instead of 'doing' in missions lessens the dependency on outsiders and equips the locals to meet needs and share the gospel.

=== Aviation ===
The aviation program was one of the first developed at I-TEC with the goal of reaching people beyond roads. Currently, the program focuses on training missionary pilots (I-FLY) and developing UAVs (unmanned aerial vehicles) to fly without a pilot to hard to reach areas. In December 2015, the I-TEC UAV team completed successful testing of the UAV in Ecuador.

=== Health ===
I-TEC's health programs train in basic dentistry (I-DENT), basic medical care (I-MED), and vision enhancement (I-SEE). The I-DENT program uses the Portable Dental Chair, developed by I-TEC in 2002 to make dental work in frontier areas easier for patients and dentists.

=== Engineering ===
The I-FIX program was launched in Ecuador and has since been used around the world to train local Christ-followers to troubleshoot and repair motorcycles, chainsaws, outboard motors, and other small engine tools.

=== Media ===
The I-FILM training program was developed to teach basic documentary story-telling to indigenous Christ-followers in 2014. The training centers around iPads, equipping students with a device to shoot video, edit and distribute on one device.

=== Discipleship ===
LIFE Study was released in 2015 as a discipleship program for the indigenous Christ-followers in the United States.

== Maverick LSA ==
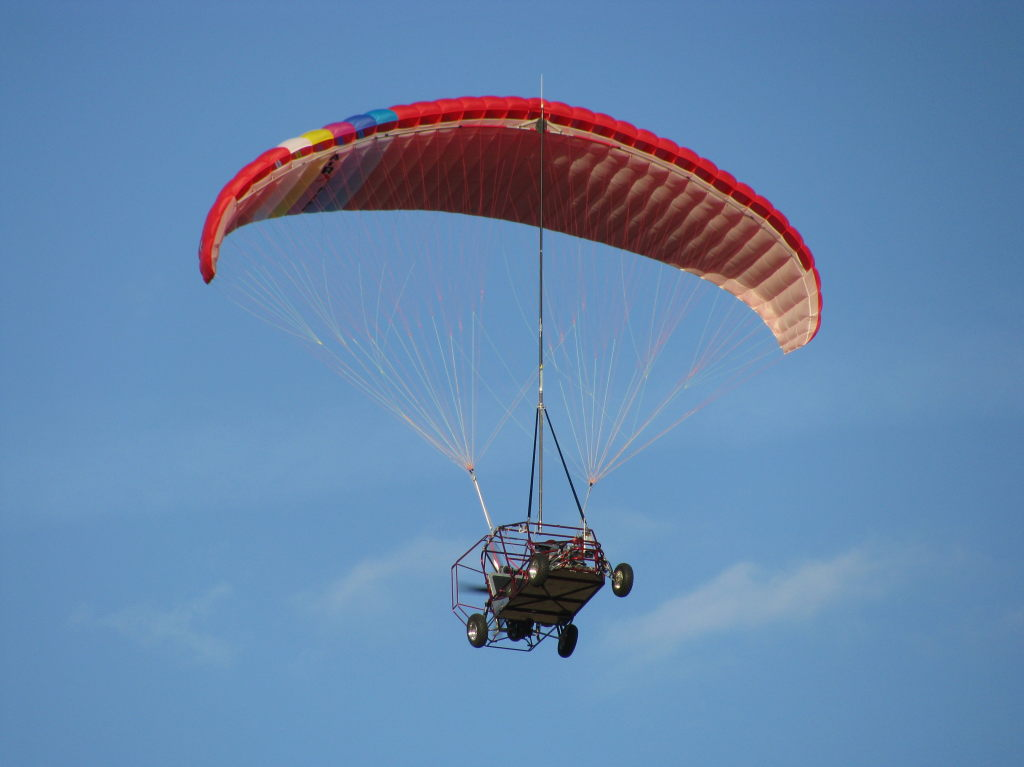
The Maverick in flight.

Developed by I-TEC, the Maverick is designed to be an easy-to-use ground and aerial vehicle. According to Popular Mechanics, the Maverick "looks like a dune buggy, but one with a propeller in back like an Everglades airboat and, billowing above, a rainbow colored flex wing … held aloft on a mast." Equipped with the largest powered parachute available, the Maverick was first accepted by the Federal Aviation Administration as an experimental aircraft on April 14, 2008.

Capable of interstate speeds on pavement, the Maverick's dune buggy-like frame of chromoly tubing gives it the ability to be used off-road. Additionally, the vehicle can deploy a parafoil and fly as a powered parachute. It weighs about 1100 pounds and has a useful carrying capacity equivalent to a Cessna 172 (fuel and 550 pounds cargo). With a 22-foot mast, the Maverick can take off and land in weather conditions that other powered parachutes would not be able to safely handle. Steve Saint has said he envisions the Maverick being useful to the Huaorani and other Indian groups, farmers and ranchers, pipeline inspection crews, and anyone else needing to traverse rough, roadless ground. Popular Mechanics gave it their Breakthrough Award in 2009.
