= List of Waorani people =

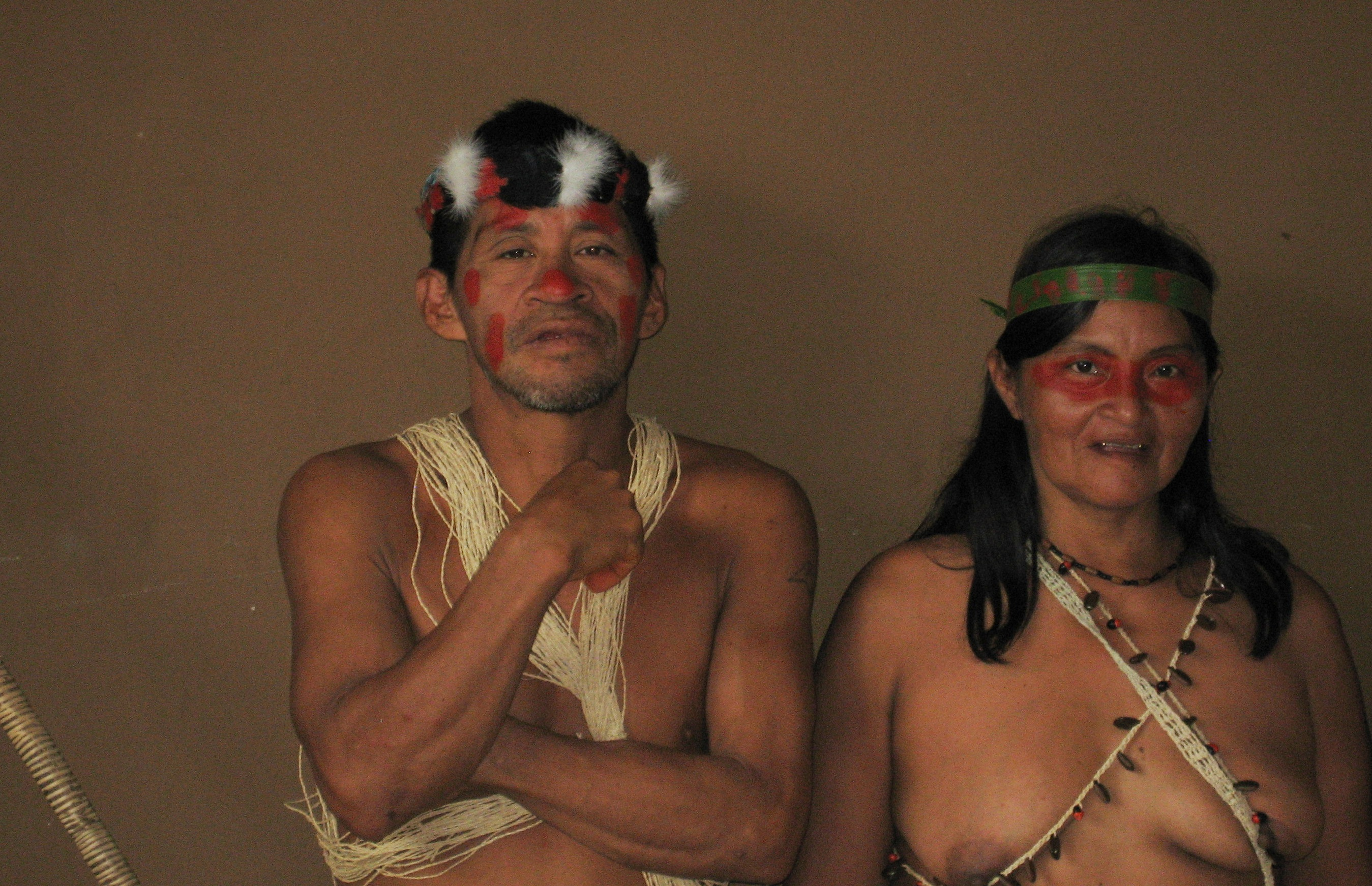
Waorani man and woman

This list contains notable members of the Waorani tribe of Ecuador.

Many names have alternative spellings, because the Waorani language contains phonemes that were unknown to those who first studied the language. The Waorani did not have a writing system until after outside contact, which led to a lack of spelling standardization.

Surnames are sometimes used to indicate one's father, but they do not appear to be commonly used in Waorani culture.

Many dates are unknown because the Waorani did not mark time for many years. Most dates are estimated by approximate ages during certain events, and a generation gap of about 20 years. Dates that have been verified are linked.

== Men ==
- Awañetae (c. 1915–c. 1955) was Gabo and Ompodae's father. He was killed by Dabo while sleeping in his hammock.
- Caento (Tyaento; c. 1915–c. 1947) was Dayuma's father. He was mortally speared in the knee by Moipa, crippling him at first. His death led to Dayuma's flight from her home.
- Dabo (born ca. 1935) is the killer of Awañetae. He also tried to kill Awañetae's son, Gabo, with a machete. Later in life, Dabo gave up his life of killing, making the observation that the tribe would have killed each other off had they not stopped spearing each other. His wife's name was Weba.
- Dyuwi Tani (Dyuwe, Yowi Tañi; born c. 1935) was one of the six men from the attack at Palm Beach, and is one of the three surviving participants. A few months after the massacre, he and Nimonga also speared Nenkiwi. He had been promised to Gimade to marry, and his animosity was directed against Nenkiwi who had taken Gimade instead. Dyuwi later became a Christian and an elder in the Waorani church. He and Kimo baptized Kathy and Steve Saint in 1970. He has a reputation as a quiet person.
- Enkedi (c. 1915–c. 1950) was the father of Mincaye. He participated in an attack on the village of Arajuno and killed several Quichua Indians. When the Arajunos fought back, those who attacked with Enkedi fled, but he stayed to fight them and was killed.
- Itaeca (Itaeka born c. 1925) is Moipa's brother. He speared Kimo's mother and Moipa.
- Gabo (c. 1935–c. 1955) was Ompodae's brother. He was attacked and mortally wounded by Dabo. After receiving a severe cut on his face, he died soon afterwards.
- Gikita Wawae (Giketa, Guikita; c. 1915–February 13, 1997) was the leader of the attack at Palm Beach. He later became a Christian as well as an elder in the Waorani church. During Operation Auca when Nate Saint was making gift drops from his airplane, Gikita was the first to offer a gift in return. He stole Paa's parrot and put him in the basket for the missionaries.
- Kimo Yeti (born c. 1935) was one of the six men from the attack at Palm Beach, and is one of the three surviving participants.

Kimo took Dawa as his wife after participating in a spearing raid which killed most of her immediate family. They were not able to have children, but he never took another wife. In 1956, he was part of the spearing raid at Palm Beach where he is believed to have killed Pete Fleming, the second of the missionaries to be killed. Later he became one of the first Huaroni converts to Christianity (after Dayuma and his wife Dawa). He built a home for the missionaries, despite resistance from within the tribe. He later became an elder in the Waorani church. Kimo, along with Dyuwi, baptized Kathy and Steve Saint in the Curaray River. Rachel Saint once took him and Komi to Berlin, Germany for a Billy Graham evangelistic conference where he shared his testimony in front of an international audience.

- Komi (born c. 1935) is Dayuma's husband. Rachel Saint once took him and Kimo to Berlin, Germany for a Billy Graham evangelistic conference where he shared his testimony in front of an international audience. Their testimonies were reported to be so moving to the audience, that one pastor ran onto the stage to meet them.
- Mincaye Enquedi (Mincayi, Minkayi, or Minkayani, Wao for "Wasp"; born c. 1935 - 28 April 2020) was one of the six men from the attack at Palm Beach, of which there are three surviving participants. He later became a Christian as well as an elder in the Waorani church. He has become one of the most outspoken of the Waorani due to his many appearances in the United States alongside Steve Saint. The 2006 film End of the Spear focuses mainly on his life.

Mincaye is also the name of Mincaye's grandson, who is sometimes called "Mincaye, Jr." The name was also given to Jaime Saint as a tribal name.

- Moipa (c. 1925–c. 1955) was known as one of the fiercest and strongest Wao warriors. He once attacked Arajuno and speared six Shell Oil Company employees. He also speared Kimo's mother, but she survived. He also terrorized Dayuma's family, severely wounding her father, Caento. Moipa was eventually killed by his brother, Itaeca, in retaliation.
- Nampa (c. 1935–1956 or 1957) was Dayuma's younger brother and was one of the six men from the attack at Palm Beach. His other sister, Gimade, was the love interest of Nenkiwi, and Nampa was so much against the idea of them marrying he was ready to spear Nenkiwi.

Nampa died after the attack at Palm Beach, and the time of death as well as the cause of death have been the subject of a small controversy. During the attack, he was injured in the head by a bullet fired from one of the missionaries' pistols. Some claimed that Nampa died shortly afterwards from complications related to the injury, while others have reported that he lived on for well over a year and died during a hunting expedition.

- Nenkiwi (Kemi, Naenkiwi, Nankiwi, Nengkewi, or Nenquihui, nicknamed "George"; c. 1935–56) was one of the three visitors to Palm Beach two days before the massacre. He was following Gimade whom he wanted to marry. His first wife had been speared and he himself had drowned his second wife. At the time he already had two wives, as well as a reputation as a trouble maker. This led the tribe to be much against the idea of him marrying Gimade as well.

During the visit at Palm Beach, Nenkiwi ate hamburgers and spoke with the missionaries. Nate Saint took him for two rides in the airplane. During the second ride, Saint buzzed Nenkiwi's village as he called to his friends below, almost falling out of the plane at one point. Later Nenkiwi lied to the other Waorani and told them that the missionaries were hostile and had threatened him. This was the excuse that led to the massacre at Palm Beach, even though Mincaye said later that they knew Nenkiwi was lying.

Later that same year, Nenkiwi was speared by Dyuwi and Nimonga. As was Wao custom, his children were to be buried with him. His daughter was strangled to death and placed in the grave next to him, but his son, Tementa, who was a baby at the time, was saved by his mother, Epa.

- Nimonga (Nimungka; c. 1935–1990) was one of the six men from the attack at Palm Beach. He is believed to have speared both Jim Elliot and Roger Youderian during the attack. Later, he and Dyuwi speared Nenkiwi.
- Paa (born ca. 1950) is an elder in the Wao church. When he was a child, he was the owner of the tame parrot that was given to the missionaries during the gift drops. Paa was upset about giving up the bird, but he had no choice in the matter.
- Tementa Nenquihui (Tamaenta, Teminta, Temente, Tementa Nenquiwi Huamoni; born c. 1956) is the son of Nenkiwi and Epa. He became a Christian and a tribal leader. He and Mincaye together baptized Anna McCully, the granddaughter of Ed McCully, in the Curaray River. He was trained to fly a powered parachute as part of Steve Saint's efforts to help the Waorani become more self-dependent. His wife's name is Nemontae.
- Toñae (Tona c. 1947–1970) was the first Waorani martyr. He was living with the upriver Waorani tribe where the missionaries first came, although he was originally from the downriver tribe. The downriver and upriver tribes were historical enemies, and Toñae had been captured as a child during an upriver raid on the downriver tribe. After becoming a Christian, he wanted to return to his family to evangelize them as well. At first they were happy that he had returned home, but when they realized that he had given up spearing, they turned on him and killed him. The village of Tonampade is named after him.

== Women ==
- Aepi (born c. 1940) fled the village with Dayuma.
- Akawo (c. 1915–1975) was Dayuma and Nampa's mother. She was one of the four women from the attack at Palm Beach.
- Alicia Cawiya (given name Hueiya) is the vice-president of the National Waorani Federation (NAWE) and one of the founders of the Asociación de Mujeres Waorani del Ecuador (Ecuador Waorani Women Association).
- Bibanca (born c. 1940) was Mincaye's younger sister. She was killed by an anaconda while sitting in a canoe.
- Dawa (born c. 1935) is Kimo's wife. She was present at Palm Beach during the massacre, but she did not participate in the attack. Instead she hid in the jungle on the far side of the river. She said that the whole time she wanted the others to stop the killing, but was unable to stop them. During the skirmish, her wrist was injured from a stray bullet from one of the missionaries' weapons. Dawa believed the shot was meant as a warning and not intended for her, since it appeared none of the missionaries had seen where she was hiding. After the attack, she went up into the missionaries' tree house. Later, Dawa became the second member of the tribe to become a Christian (after Dayuma). She also became close with Steve Saint, who calls her "Grandmother Dawa".
- Dayuma (Dayumae; born c. 1930–2014) fled her tribe as a young girl with Aepi and Omi. She lived with Quechua Indians and American missionaries. Dayuma was helpful in teaching the Waorani language to the missionaries. Dayuma was the first known Waorani to convert to Christianity. She eventually moved back to live with her people along with Rachel Saint and Elisabeth Elliot.
- Epa (born ca. 1935) was Nenkiwi's oldest living wife. According to custom, she killed her daughter Gamae to be buried with Nenkiwi. Her son Tementa, a baby at the time, would have had the same fate, but Epa took him and ran away, saving his life.
- Gamae (c. 1950–1956) was Nenkiwi and Epa's daughter. According to custom, she was killed and buried with her father when he died.
- Gimade (Gimari, nicknamed "Delilah"; born c. 1938) was Nampa and Dayuma's sister. She visited Palm Beach along with Nenkiwi and Gimare two days before the massacre. She had come to the beach because she wanted to see Dayuma, whom she assumed would be with the missionaries. She was being pursued romantically by Nenkiwi. She later died in childbirth.
- Mankamo (Mankuma, Wao for "Blackbird") is Gikita's widow. She and Mintaka were the ones who initiated contact with the outside world, after they left their tribe in search of Dayuma.
- Mintaka (Wao for "Blue Macaw"; born c. 1915) was Gikita's sister. She was the older woman who visited Palm Beach along with Nenkiwi and Gimade two days before the massacre. She had come acting as a chaperone for Nenkiwi and Gimade. However, when they left, Mintaka stayed behind with the missionaries well into the night. Two days later she returned to Palm Beach and was one of the four women from the attack. In November 1958, Mintaka and Mankamo left their tribe and met Elisabeth Elliot in Arajuno. She stayed there for almost a year, then returned to the tribe. When she came back, she invited Elisabeth and Rachel to come and live with them.
- Miñimo (Minyimo; died 1956) was one of the four women from the attack at Palm Beach.
- Nemo (Nimo, Nimu, Wao for "Star"; c. 1935–c. 1945) was one of Dayuma's sisters and was killed by hostile Wao warriors with a machete. Earlier in her life, she was very sick with a fever, and after drinking from a certain creek, the water seemed to heal her. Later, when Steve Saint returned to help the Waorani build a community center in the jungle, they happened to build it at the same place where Nemo's creek was. They called the new community Nemompode, "Star Creek", after Nemo. Both Rachel and Stephenie Saint were also given the name Nemo as a tribal name.
- Omi (Umi; born c. 1940) was Dayuma's cousin. She fled the village with her.
- Ompodae (born c. 1935) was Mincaye's wife. She was originally a member of the downriver clan who were the historical enemies of Mincaye's clan. Most of her family was killed during a spearing raid led by Dyuwi, Mincaye, Dabo, and Nenkiwi. Although she was taken to be Mincaye's wife by force, they developed a strong relationship. Like Mincaye, she has also traveled to the United States.

== Other Names ==
- Waengongi (Wangongi) – Name of the creator god. The ancient Waorani taught that Waengongi had created the world, and while he still provided for them, he no longer communicated with them. The missionaries used the name to refer to God the Father.
- Itota (Wao for "God") – This name was used by the missionaries for Jesus, the Son of Waengongi.

=== Tribal Names ===
Names given by the tribe to outsiders who have lived with them.

- Nemo ("Star") – Rachel Saint
- Gikari (Gikadi, Wao name for a Campephilus woodpecker) – Elisabeth Elliot
- Babae (Sounds like the Wao word for "wild") – Steve Saint
- Ongingcamo – Ginny Saint
- Toñae – Shaun Saint
- Mincaye ("Wasp") – Jaime Saint
- Yeti – Jesse Saint
- Nemo ("Star") – Stephenie Saint
