= End of the Spear (book) =

2005 book by Steve Saint

- Author: Steve Saint
- Language: English
- Genre: Nonfiction
- Publisher: Saltriver
- Publication date: December 5, 2005
- Publication place: United States
- Media type: Hardback and Paperback
- Pages: 338
- ISBN: 0-8423-6439-0
- OCLC: 61211315
- Dewey Decimal: 986.6 22
- LC Class: F3722.1.H83 S34 2005

End of the Spear is a book written by Steve Saint. It was published in connection with the film of the same name. The book chronicles the continuing story that began with Elisabeth Elliot's 1957 bestseller Through Gates of Splendor.

The book focuses on the Waodani tribe of eastern Ecuador, and their progression from being known as violent savages to followers of Christ. It also tells the story of the life of Steve Saint and his eventual partnership with Mincaye, the same man who killed his father, Nate Saint.
