= I-TEC Maverick =

Powered parachute aircraft

ITEC Maverick
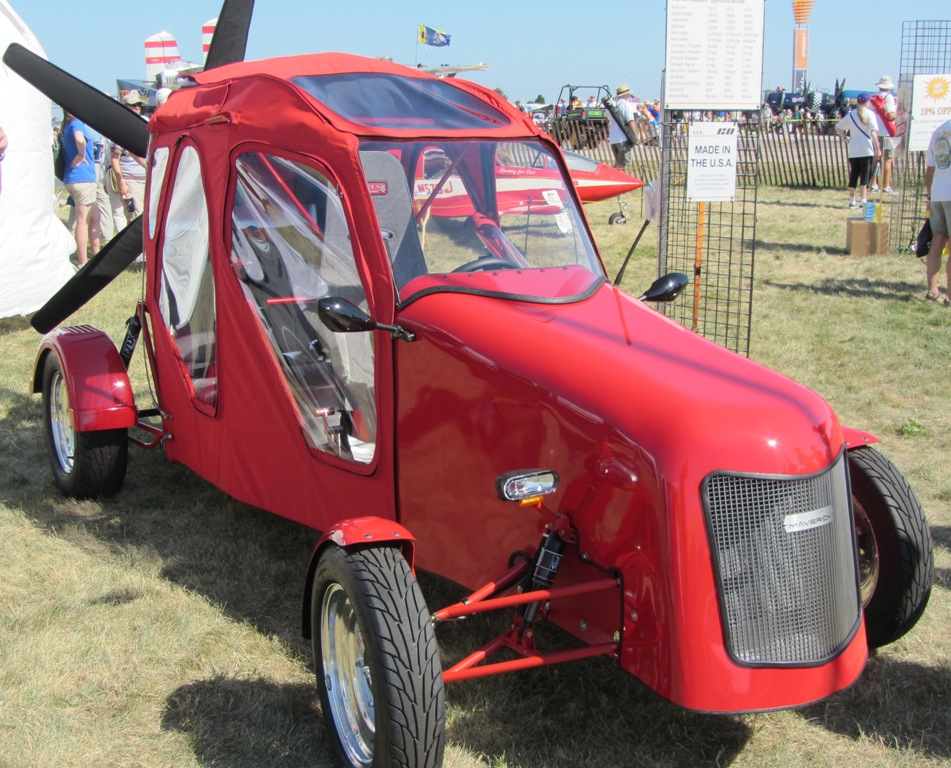

General information
- Type: Powered parachute, roadable aircraft
- National origin: United States
- Manufacturer: Indigenous People's Technology and Education Center (ITEC)

The ITEC Maverick is a powered parachute aircraft with a roadable fuselage.

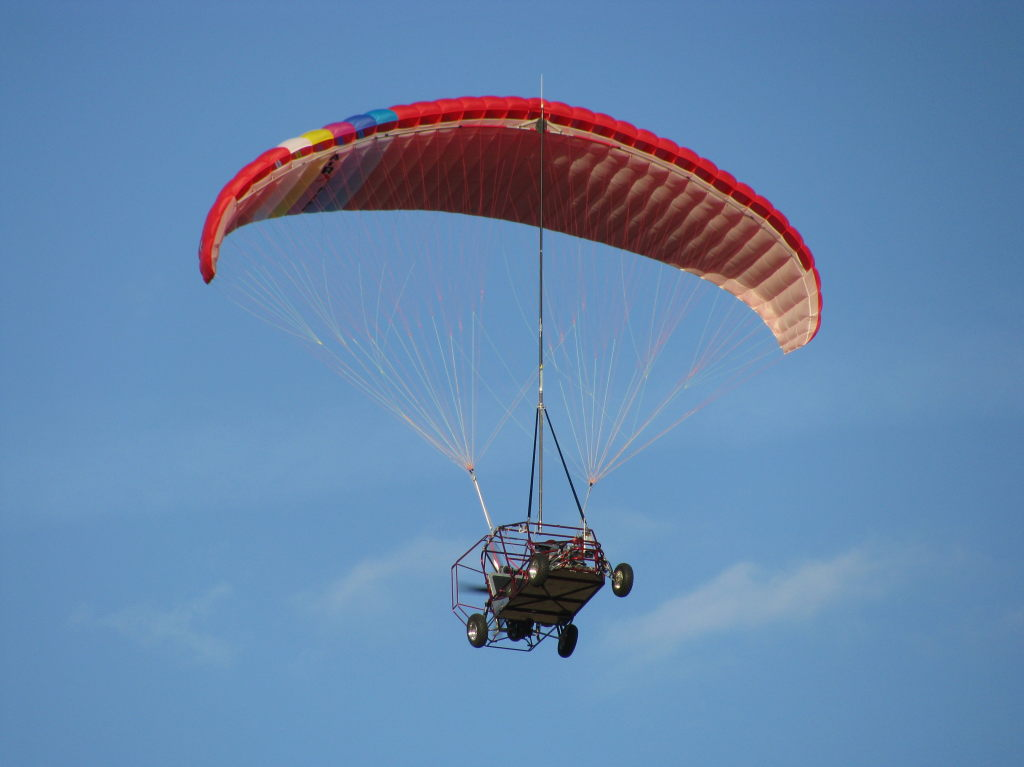
prototype flight

== Design and development ==
Equipped with a powered parachute certified by the FAA, the Maverick received experimental aircraft airworthiness certification on April 14, 2008, with N-Number 356MV.

Capable of interstate speeds on pavement, the Maverick's dune buggy-like frame of chromoly tubing gives it the ability to be used off-road. Additionally, the vehicle can deploy a parafoil and fly as a powered parachute. It weighs about 1100 pounds and has a useful carrying capacity equivalent to a Cessna 172 (fuel and 550 pounds cargo). With a 22-foot mast, the Maverick can take off and land in weather conditions that other powered parachutes would not be able to safely operate in. The developer, Steve Saint has said he envisions the Maverick being useful to the Huaorani and other Indian groups, farmers and ranchers, pipeline inspection crews and anyone else with a requirement to traverse rough, roadless ground. Popular Mechanics gave it their Breakthrough Award in 2009. In 2012, the Maverick was accepted by the United States FAA to operate as an Experimental homebuilt, S-LSA, or E-LSA.

== Project status ==
There were two accidents – in which there were no deaths – involving the parachute wing. Due to insufficient resources to re-engineer the wing, development of the Maverick has been concluded. ITEC is seeking a buyer that will continue development of the aircraft.

== Variants ==
Maverick URVATV (Ultimate Roadable, All-Terrain, Aerial Vehicle)
Initial model
Maverick HPAV (High Performance Aerial Vehicle)
Transaxle removed, fan drive only
Maverick HPRATV (High-Performance, Roadable, All-Terrain Vehicle )
Wheel drive only, convertible to flight.
Maverick XTRV (Xtreme Roadable Vehicle)
300 hp (224 kW) wheel drive only.

== Specifications (Maverick) ==
Data from Manufacturer

General characteristics

- Crew: 1
- Capacity: 1
- Powerplant: 1 × 2.5l Subaru Four cylinder, 190 hp (140 kW)
- Propellers: 5-bladed Warp Drive

Performance

- Cruise speed: 35 kn (40 mph, 64 km/h)
- Endurance: 3 hours
- Service ceiling: 10,000 ft (3,000 m)
- Rate of climb: 600 ft/min (3.0 m/s)
