= Operation Auca =

1955 Christian proselytizing in Ecuador

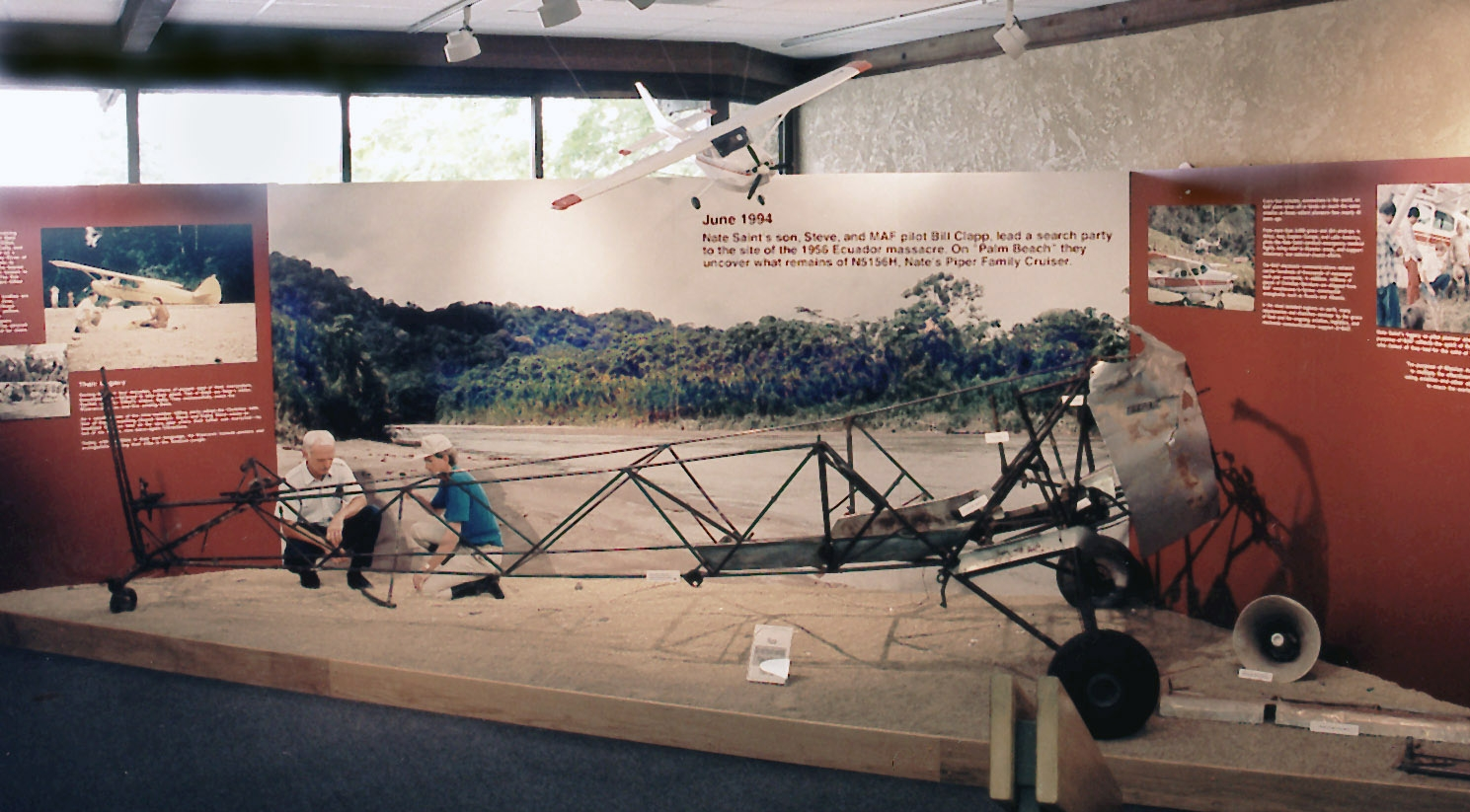
Nate Saint's aircraft was discovered in 1994, buried in the sand along the Curaray River. The frame was reconstructed and is now on display at the headquarters of the Mission Aviation Fellowship in Nampa, Idaho.

Operation Auca was an attempt by five Evangelical Christian missionaries from the United States to bring Christianity to the Waorani or Huaorani people of the Amazon rainforest of Ecuador. The Waorani, also known pejoratively as Aucas (a modification of awqa, the Quechua word for "savages"), were an isolated tribe known for their violence, against both their own people and outsiders who entered their territory. With the intention to evangelize the previously uncontacted Waorani, the missionaries began making regular flights over Waorani settlements in September 1955, dropping gifts, which were reciprocated. After several months of exchanging gifts, on January 3, 1956, the missionaries established a camp at "Palm Beach", a sandbar along the Curaray River, a few kilometers from Waorani settlements. Their efforts came to an end on January 8, 1956, when all five—Jim Elliot, Nate Saint, Ed McCully, Peter Fleming, and Roger Youderian—were attacked and speared by a group of Waorani warriors. The news of their deaths was broadcast around the world, and Life magazine covered the event with a photo essay.

The deaths of the men galvanized the missionary effort in the United States, sparking an outpouring of funding for evangelization efforts around the world. Their work is still frequently remembered in evangelical publications, and in 2006 was the subject of the film production End of the Spear. Several years after the death of the men, the widow of Jim Elliot, Elisabeth, and the sister of Nate Saint, Rachel, returned to Ecuador as missionaries with the Summer Institute of Linguistics (now SIL International) to live among the Waorani.

== Waorani ==
The Waorani around the time of Operation Auca were a small tribe occupying the jungle of Eastern Ecuador between the Napo and Curaray Rivers, an area of approximately 20,000 square kilometers (7,700 mi^{2}). They numbered approximately 600 people, and were split into three groups, all mutually hostile—the Geketaidi, the Baïidi, and the Wepeidi. They lived on the gathering and cultivation of plant foods like manioc and plantains, as well as fishing and hunting with spear and blowgun. Family units consisted of a man and his wife or wives, their unmarried sons, their married daughters and sons-in-law, and their grandchildren. All of them would reside in a longhouse, which was separated by several kilometers from another longhouse in which close relatives lived. Marriage was always endogamous and typically between cousins, and arranged by the parents of the young people.

Before their first peaceful contact with outsiders (cowodi) in 1958, the Waorani fiercely defended their territory. Viewing all cowodi as cannibalistic predators, they killed rubber tappers around the turn of the 20th century and Shell Oil Company employees during the 1940s, in addition to any lowland Quechua or other outsiders who encroached on their land. Furthermore, they were prone to internal violence, often engaging in vengeance killing of other Waorani. Raids were carried out in extreme anger by groups of men who attacked their victims' longhouse by night and then fled. Attempts to build truces through gifts and exchange of spouses became more frequent as their numbers decreased and the tribes fragmented, but the cycle of violence continued.

== Missionaries ==
Jim Elliot first heard of the Waorani in 1950 from a former missionary to Ecuador, and afterwards indicated that God had called him to Ecuador to evangelize the Waorani. He began corresponding with his friend Pete Fleming about his desire to minister in Ecuador, and in 1952 the two men set sail for Guayaquil as missionaries with the Plymouth Brethren. For six months they lived in Quito with the goal of learning Spanish. They then moved to Shandia, a Quechua mission station deep in the Ecuadorian jungle. There they worked under the supervision of a Christian Missions in Many Lands missionary, Wilfred Tidmarsh, and began exposing themselves to the culture and studying the Quechua language.

Another team member was Ed McCully, a man Jim Elliot had met and befriended while both attended Wheaton College. Following graduation, he married Marilou Hobolth and enrolled in a one-year basic medical treatment program at the School of Missionary Medicine at the Bible Institute of Los Angeles. On December 10, 1952, McCully moved to Quito with his family as a Plymouth Brethren missionary, planning to soon join Elliot and Fleming in Shandia. In 1953, however, the station in Shandia was wiped out by a flood, delaying their move until September of that year.

The team's pilot, Nate Saint, had served in the military during World War II, receiving flight training as a member of the Army Air Corps. After being discharged in 1946, he too studied at Wheaton College, but quit after a year and joined the Mission Aviation Fellowship in 1948. He and his wife Marj traveled to Ecuador by the end of the year, and they settled at MAF headquarters in Shell. Shortly after his arrival, Saint began transporting supplies and equipment to missionaries spread throughout the jungle. This work ultimately led to his meeting the other four missionaries, whom he joined in Operation Auca.

Also on the team was Roger Youderian, a 33-year-old missionary who had been working in Ecuador since 1953. Under the mission board Gospel Missionary Union, he and his wife Barbara and daughter Beth settled in Macuma, a mission station in the southern jungle of Ecuador. There, he and his wife ministered to the Shuar people, learning their language and transcribing it. After working with them for about a year, Youderian and his family began ministering to a tribe related to the Shuar, the Achuar people. He worked with Nate Saint to provide important medical supplies; but after a period of attempting to build relationships with them, he failed to see any positive effect and, growing depressed, considered returning to the United States. However, during this time Saint approached him about joining their team to meet the Waorani, and he assented.

== Initial contact ==
Map denoting key locations in Operation Auca

The first stage of Operation Auca began in September 1955. Saint, McCully, Elliot, and fellow missionary Johnny Keenan decided to initiate contact with the Waorani and began periodically searching for them by air. By the end of the month, they had identified several clearings in the jungle. Meanwhile, Elliot learned several phrases in the language of the Waorani from Dayuma, a young Waorani woman who had left her society and become friends with Rachel Saint, a missionary and the sister of Nate Saint. The missionaries hoped that by regularly giving gifts to the Waorani and attempting to communicate with them in their language, they would be able to earn their trust.

Because of the difficulty and risk of meeting the Waorani on the ground, the missionaries chose to drop gifts to the Waorani by fixed-wing aircraft. Their drop technique, developed by Nate Saint, involved flying around the drop location in tight circles while lowering the gift from the plane on a rope. This kept the bundle in roughly the same position as it approached the ground. On October 6, 1955, Saint made the first drop, releasing a small kettle containing buttons and rock salt. The gift-giving continued during the following weeks, with the missionaries dropping machetes, ribbons, clothing, pots, and various trinkets.

After several visits to the Waorani village which the missionaries called "Terminal City", they observed that the Waorani seemed excited to receive their gifts. Encouraged, they began using a loudspeaker to shout simple Waorani phrases as they circled. After several more drops, in November the Waorani began tying gifts for the missionaries to the line after removing the gifts the missionaries gave them. The men took this as a gesture of friendliness and developed plans for meeting the Waorani on the ground. Saint soon identified a 200-yard (200 m) sandbar along the Curaray River about 4.5 miles (7 km) from Terminal City that could serve as a runway and camp site, and dubbed it "Palm Beach".

== Palm Beach ==
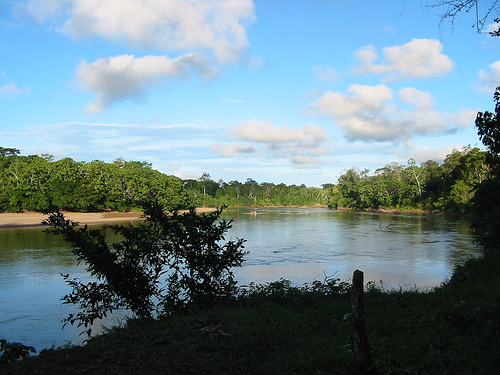
The Curaray River

At this point, Pete Fleming had still not decided to participate in the operation, and Roger Youderian was still working in the jungle farther south. On December 23, the Flemings, Saints, Elliots and McCullys together made plans to land at Palm Beach and build a camp on January 3, 1956. They agreed to take weapons, but decided that they would only be used to fire into the air to scare the Waorani if they attacked. They built a sort of tree house that could be assembled upon arrival, and collected gifts, first aid equipment, and language notes.

By January 2, Youderian had arrived and Fleming had confirmed his involvement, so the five met in Arajuno to prepare to leave the following day. After minor mechanical trouble with the plane, Saint and McCully took off at 8:02 a.m. on January 3 and successfully landed on the sandy beach along the Curaray River. Saint then flew Elliot and Youderian to the camp, and then made several more flights, carrying equipment. After the last delivery, he flew over a Waorani settlement and, using a loudspeaker, told the Waorani to visit the missionaries' camp. He then returned to Arajuno, and the next day, he and Fleming flew out to Palm Beach.

=== First visit ===
On January 6, after the missionaries had spent several days of waiting and shouting basic Waorani phrases into the jungle, the first Waorani visitors arrived. A young man and two women emerged on the opposite river bank around 11:15 a.m., and soon joined the missionaries at their encampment. The younger of the two women had come against the wishes of her family, and the man, named Nankiwi, who was romantically interested in her, followed. The older woman (about thirty years old) acted as a self-appointed chaperone. The men gave them several gifts, including a model plane, and the visitors soon relaxed and began conversing freely, apparently not realizing that the men's language skills were weak. Nankiwi, whom the missionaries nicknamed "George", showed interest in their aircraft, so Saint took off with him aboard. They first completed a circuit around the camp, but Nankiwi appeared eager for a second trip, so they flew toward Terminal City. Upon reaching a familiar clearing, Nankiwi recognized his neighbors, and leaning out of the plane, wildly waved and shouted to them. Later that afternoon, the younger woman became restless, and though the missionaries offered their visitors sleeping quarters, Nankiwi and the young woman left the beach with little explanation. The older woman apparently had more interest in conversing with the missionaries, and remained there most of the night.

After seeing Nankiwi in the plane, a small group of Waorani decided to make the trip to Palm Beach, and left the following morning, January 7. On the way, they encountered Nankiwi and the girl, returning unescorted. The girl's brother, Nampa, was furious at this, and to defuse the situation and divert attention from himself, Nankiwi claimed that the foreigners had attacked them on the beach, and in their haste to flee, they had been separated from their chaperone. Gikita, a senior member of the group whose experience with outsiders had taught him that they could not be trusted, recommended that they kill the foreigners. The return of the older woman and her account of the friendliness of the missionaries was not enough to dissuade them, and they soon continued toward the beach.

=== Attack ===
On January 8 the missionaries waited, expecting a larger group of Waorani to arrive sometime that afternoon, if only to get plane rides. Saint made several trips over Waorani settlements, and on the following morning he noted a group of Waorani men traveling toward Palm Beach. He excitedly relayed this information to his wife over the radio at 12:30 p.m., promising to make contact again at 4:30 p.m.

The Waorani arrived at Palm Beach around 3:00 p.m., and in order to divide the foreigners before attacking them, they sent three women to the other side of the river. One, Dawa, remained hidden in the jungle, but the other two showed themselves. Two of the missionaries waded into the water to greet them, but were attacked from behind by Nampa. Apparently attempting to scare him, Elliot, the first missionary to be speared, pulled out his pistol and began firing. One of these shots mildly injured Dawa, still hidden, and another grazed the missionary's attacker after he was grabbed from behind by one of the women. The other missionary in the river, Fleming, before being speared, desperately reiterated friendly overtures and asked the Waorani why they were killing them. Meanwhile, the other Waorani warriors, led by Gikita, attacked the three missionaries still on the beach, spearing Saint first, then McCully as he rushed to stop them. Youderian made it to the airplane and turned on the radio to report the attack but was speared while waiting for Shell to pick up the call. The Waorani then threw the men's bodies and their belongings in the river, and ripped the fabric from their aircraft. They then returned to their village and, anticipating retribution, burned it to the ground and fled into the jungle.

=== Search ===
At 4:30 p.m., Marj Saint and Pete Fleming's wife, Olive (nee Ainslie), were waiting for the call from Saint. Not receiving word at 4:30 p.m. immediately caused his wife Marj to worry, but Marj and Olive did not tell anyone about the lack of communication until that evening. To avoid interference, the entire mission had been kept a secret from all those not directly involved at the time, thus making the timing of this announcement more difficult. The next morning, January 9, Johnny Keenan flew to the camp site, and at 9:30 a.m. he reported via radio to the wives that the plane was stripped of its fabric, and that the men were not there. The Commander in Chief of the Caribbean Command, Lieutenant General William K. Harrison, was contacted, and Quito-based radio station HCJB released a news bulletin saying that five men were missing in Waorani territory. Soon, aircraft from the United States Air Rescue Service in Panama were flying over the jungle, and a ground search party consisting of missionaries and military personnel was organized. The first two of the bodies were found on Wednesday, January 11, and on Thursday, Ed McCully's body was identified by a group of Quechuas. They took his watch as evidence of the finding but did not move his body from its location on the bank of the Curaray; it was later washed away. Two more bodies were found on January 12. The searchers hoped that one of the unidentified bodies would be McCully, thinking that perhaps one of the men had escaped. However, on January 13, all four of the bodies found were positively identified by watches and wedding rings, and McCully's body was not among them, confirming that all five were dead. In the midst of a tropical storm, they were buried in a common grave at Palm Beach on January 14 by members of the ground search party.

== Aftermath ==
The deaths of the men was covered in the January 30, 1956 issue of Life magazine with a photo essay, including photographs by Cornell Capa and some taken by the five men before their deaths. A follow-up photo essay by Capa about four of the five widows who stayed in Ecuador to continue with their deceased husbands' missionary work appeared sixteen months later in the May 20, 1957 issue of the same publication. The ensuing worldwide publicity gave several missionary organizations significantly more visibility, especially in the United States and Latin America. Most notable among these was the Summer Institute of Linguistics (SIL), the organization for which both Elisabeth Elliot and Rachel Saint worked. Saint considered herself spiritually bonded to the Waorani, believing that what she saw as his sacrifice for the Waorani was symbolic of Christ's death for the salvation of humanity. In 1957, Saint and her Waorani companion Dayuma toured across the United States and appeared on the television show This Is Your Life. The two also appeared in a Billy Graham crusade in New York City, contributing to Saint's increasing popularity among evangelical Christians and generating significant monetary donations for SIL.

Saint and Elliot returned to Ecuador to work among the Waorani (1958–1960), establishing a camp called Tihueno near a former Waorani settlement. Rachel Saint and Dayuma became bonded in Waorani eyes through their shared mourning and Rachel's adoption as a sister of Dayuma, taking the name Nemo from the latter's deceased youngest sister. Nemo means star in Waorani, they said she was their light. The first Waorani to settle there were primarily women and children from a Waorani group called the Guiquetairi, but in 1968 an enemy Waorani band known as the Baihuari joined them. Elliot had returned to the United States in the early 1960s, so Saint and Dayuma worked to alleviate the resulting conflict. They succeeded in securing cohabitation of the two groups by overseeing numerous cross-band weddings, leading to an end of inter-clan warfare but obscuring the cultural identity of each group.

Saint and Dayuma, in conjunction with SIL, negotiated the creation of an official Waorani reservation in 1969, consolidating the Waorani and consequently opening up the area to commerce and oil exploration. By 1973, over 500 people lived in Tihueno, of which more than half had arrived in the previous six years. The settlement relied on aid from SIL, and as a Christian community, followed rules foreign to Waorani culture like prohibitions on killing and polygamy. By the early 1970s, SIL began to question whether their impact on the Waorani was positive, so they sent James Yost, a staff anthropologist, to assess the situation. He found extensive economic dependence and increasing cultural assimilation, and as a result, SIL ended its support of the settlement in 1976, leading to its disintegration and the dispersion of the Waorani into the surrounding area. SIL had hoped that the Waorani would return to the isolation in which they had lived twenty years prior, but instead they sought out contact with the outside world, forming villages of which many have been recognized by the Ecuadorian government.

== Legacy ==
=== Evangelical Christian views ===
Among evangelical Christians, the five men are commonly considered martyrs and missionary heroes. Books have been written about them by numerous biographers, most notably Elisabeth Elliot. Anniversaries of their deaths have been accompanied by stories in major Christian publications, and their story, as well as the subsequent acceptance of Christianity among the Waorani, has been turned into several motion pictures.

Even so, Christians have noted with concern the disintegration of traditional Waorani culture and westernization of the tribe, beginning with Nate Saint's own journal entry in 1955 and continuing through today. However, many continue to view as positive both Operation Auca and the subsequent missionary efforts of Rachel Saint, mission organizations such as Mission Aviation Fellowship, Wycliffe Bible Translators, HCJB World Radio, Avant Ministries (formerly Gospel Missionary Union), and others. Specifically, they note the decline in violence among tribe members, numerous conversions to Christianity, and growth of the local church.

=== Anthropologist views ===
Some anthropologists have less favorable views of the missionary work begun by Operation Auca, viewing the intervention as the cause for the recent and widely recognized decline of Waorani culture. Leading Waorani researcher Laura Rival says that the work of SIL pacified the Waorani during the 1960s, and argues that missionary intervention caused significant changes in fundamental components of Waorani society. Prohibitions of polygamy, violence, chanting, and dancing were directly contrary to cultural norms, and the relocation of Waorani and subsequent intermarrying of previously hostile groups eroded cultural identity.

Others are somewhat less negative—Brysk, after noting that the work of the missionaries opened the area to outside intervention and led to the deterioration of the culture, says that SIL also informed the Waorani of their legal rights and taught them how to protect their interests from developers. Boster goes even further, suggesting that the pacification of the Waorani was a result of active effort by the Waorani themselves, not the result of missionary imposition. He argues that Christianity served as a way for the Waorani to escape the cycle of violence in their community, since it provided a motivation to abstain from killing.

=== Media depictions ===
There have been several screen depictions of Operation Auca. The 2004 documentary Beyond the Gates of Splendor featured interviews with some of the Waorani and surviving family members of the missionaries. The 2006 drama film End of the Spear grossed over $12 million.

Five Wives, an award-winning novel by Joan Thomas, centred on the surviving wives of the missionaries.
