= End of the Spear =

- Theatrical release poster
- Directed by: Jim Hanon
- Screenplay by: Bill Ewing; Bart Gavigan; Jim Hanon
- Produced by: William Bowling; Bill Ewing
- Starring: Louie Leonardo; Chad Allen; Chase Ellison; Christina Souza; Jack Guzman
- Narrated by: Chad Allen
- Cinematography: Robert Driskell
- Edited by: Miles Hanon
- Music by: Ronald Owen
- Production company: Bearing Fruit Communications
- Distributed by: Every Tribe Entertainment; M Power Releasing; Rocky Mountain Pictures
- Release dates: December 2, 2005 (Los Angeles); January 20, 2006 (United States)
- Running time: 108 minutes
- Languages: English; Spanish; Emberá
- Budget: $10 million
- Box office: $12.1 million

End of the Spear is a 2005 American biographical adventure drama film directed by Jim Hanon, written by Bill Ewing, Bart Gavigan and Hanon, and stars Louie Leonardo and Chad Allen. The film recounts the story of Operation Auca, in which five American Christian missionaries attempted to evangelize the Waorani people of the tropical rain forest of Eastern Ecuador.

Based on actual events in 1956, wherein five male missionaries were speared by a group of the Waorani tribe, it is told from the perspective of Steve Saint (son of Nate Saint, one of the missionaries killed in the encounter), and Mincaye, one tribesman who participated in the attack. The two formed a lifelong bond that continued until Mincaye's death in April 2020.

== Plot ==
The animist Waorani people live along the Curaray River in a remote and mostly undeveloped Amazonian region of Ecuador. As children, Mincayani saves Dayumae after a vicious nighttime spear attack on a Waorani village by a neighboring tribe, and Dayumae's younger sister (in Dayumae's care) is killed in the attack. Other events of tribal life are pictured. In a conflict with her family, Dayumae—who, in part, has been blamed for the death of her sister—decides to leave the tribe for her safety, and runs to the "foreigners" around her: foreigners who speak Spanish and dress very differently.

Nate Saint, a missionary jungle pilot and aircraft mechanic, lives with his family at a mission outpost where his job includes flying other missionaries and supplies into remote locations. He builds a small airplane out of wood with his eight year old son, Steve. Nate becomes obsessed with making contact with a jungle tribe who have resisted contact with the outside world before, often violently: the Waorani. Nate's older sister Rachel has had extensive contact with the now much older Dayumae, and has learned some of the Waorani language from her. Nate does not want to tell his sister of his and others' plans to attempt contact with the Waorani, for fear she would pass the information along to her superiors, and the planned contact would be forbidden. Young Steve learns a few words of Waorani—"I am your sincere friend"—from Rachel, and ultimately begs his father to learn them before his father and several others land their airplane on a sandbar in the Curaray and attempt to make peaceful contact with the Waorani, who they know people that area of the forest that surrounds the sandbar.

Mincayani is now a much older and more developed warrior, exhibiting great leadership in the tribe. After some days, one Waorani man and two women approach the missionaries who have camped on the sandbar, and have a reasonably friendly, although difficult to communicate, first encounter. Subsequently, misinformation about the meeting is shared with the other Waorani tribal members, and a group of Waorani warriors decides to attack and spear the foreigners. They do so, and all five men associated with the airplane at the sandbar camp are killed with spears; the airplane—which the Waorani refer to as the large wood bee—is destroyed with punctures and slashing by spears. Authorities from Ecuador and the US military come up river in canoes in a large party, protected by many rifles, and recover four of the five bodies.

Years later, Steve Saint flies from the US to attend the funeral of Rachel Saint, and comes into contact again with Mincayani. Mincayani asks Steve to live in Ecuador, and become family to the Waorani, like Rachel had. Steve says that would be "impossible", but he does do so a year or so later.

Later, Mincayani tells Steve he needs to show him something, with no other detail, and takes Steve on the Curaray river in a canoe to the sandbar where his father had been killed many years earlier. Mincayani digs furiously in the bank of the river, and uncovers a bit of the metal frame and fabric of Nate's airplane that the Waorani had buried, and informs Steve this is where his father died. He explains that he had speared his father, that his father was a special man, and that before his father died, angels appeared in front of them to take his dying father. Mincayani gives Steve his spear, with the point at his own chest, and tells Steve to kill him. Steve struggles emotionally but does not do so. He tells Mincayani that his father did not lose his life, but he gave his life. It is, as it has been for the Waorani people for some decades now, truly the "end of the spear."

== Cast ==
- Louie Leonardo as Mincayani
- Chad Allen as Nate Saint/Steve Saint/Narrator
- Jack Guzman as Kimo
- Christina Souza as Dayumae
- Chase Ellison as Young Steve Saint
- Sean McGowan as Jim Elliot
- Sara Kathryn Bakker as Rachel Saint
- Cara Stoner as Marj Saint
- Beth Bailey as Elisabeth Elliot
- Stephen Caudill as Ed McCully
- Matt Lutz as Pete Fleming
- Chemo Mepaquito as Gikita
- Gil Birmingham as Moipa
- Jose Liberto Caizamo as Nampa
- Patrick Zeller as Roger Youderian
- Madgalena Condoba as Akawo

== Release and reception ==
=== Box office ===
Opening with a modest first weekend (January 20–22, 2006), End of the Spear took 8th place (behind one new and three expanding releases) with $4.3 million. It became one of few independent Christian films to draw more than $1 million in its first three weekends. By the end of its run, it had grossed $12.1 million. It has since grossed over $20 million in rentals and video sales.

=== Critical response ===
On the review aggregator website Rotten Tomatoes, the film has a score of 42%, based on reviews from 52 critics. The website's consensus reads, "Shoddy filmmaking and a lack of character development derail what could be a potentially compelling tale."

The film won a Crystal Heart Award as well as the Grand Prize for Best Dramatic Feature at the 2005 Heartland Film Festival.

=== Controversies ===
Some secular critics believed the story may be seen as presenting an uncritical view of a situation where native peoples were eventually exploited regardless of "good intentions" such as concerns about SIL International.

There was some concern among various Christian groups that lead actor Chad Allen, who portrays Nate Saint (and his son Steve as an adult), is openly gay. Some Christian groups that had initially planned to promote the film began to question whether they should. Steve Saint, who was heavily involved in production, has stated in interviews that he himself had reservations, but that God indicated to him that Allen was the proper choice. In the end, he couldn't see a better actor filling the role of his father. His public pronouncements did much to quell the controversy.

Other Christian groups, such as VCY America's Vic Eliason, wished the film had more explicitly portrayed the Gospel message (i.e. salvation through Jesus Christ). However, the Gospel presented is the same as was to the Waorani; in concepts and symbols that are present in everyday Waorani language (with the name of "God" being replaced with "Waengongi", the name of the Waorani creator god who no longer communicated with the people).

Due to the limitations of the cinematic format, the filmmakers had to compress various events and limit the number of characters. As a result, the main Waorani protagonist, Mincayani, is not actually one person in real life but rather a composite of the real-life Waorani named Mincaye and various others. Some of Steve's sister's experiences were attributed to Steve, and the dramatic climactic reconciliation between Steve as an adult and Mincayani did not actually happen as depicted – it was more of a slow, growing love and friendship between the real-life Steve and Mincayani.

=== Accolades ===
- In 2007, the album won a Dove Award for Instrumental Album of the Year at the 38th GMA Dove Awards.

== Extra footage ==
The DVD and some theaters where the movie was shown also included extra footage after the movie ended showing the real life Mincayani (Mincaye) and the real life Steve Saint in our modern day. Mincaye visited Steve Saint in America with humorous results while trying to understand American culture.

== Soundtrack ==
End of the Spear: Original Motion Picture Soundtrack

Soundtrack album by Various artists
- Released: January 24, 2006
- Label: Word Records

End of the Spear: Original Motion Picture Soundtrack was released on January 24, 2006 by Word Records. The soundtrack features most of the instrumental score by Ron Owen, plus featured music from the film by known CCM artists like Steven Curtis Chapman and BarlowGirl, among others.

=== Track listing ===
No.	Title	Performed by	Length
1.	"No Greater Love"	Steven Curtis Chapman	5:00
2.	"River Requiem"
3.	"Darkness Falls"
4.	"Aftermath"
5.	"Fleeing"
6.	"You Led Me"	BarlowGirl	3:52
7.	"Father and Son"
8.	"Mincayani"
9.	"Jaguar Hunt"
10.	"Vengeance"
11.	"Bibanka"
12.	"Amazon Heights"
13.	"Flight of the Wood Bee"
14.	"Deception"
15.	"Tears in the Sand"
16.	"Search"
17.	"Loss"
18.	"Always Love You"	Nicole C. Mullen	4:03
19.	"Confession"
20.	"Moving On"
21.	"Memories"
22.	"Mincayani and Dayumae"
23.	"I Will Not Kill"
24.	"First Meeting"
25.	"The Way of the Tribe"
26.	"Time That Is Left"	Mark Schultz	3:57
27.	"Desperation"
28.	"She's Gone"
29.	"Rachel's Funeral"
30.	"God Follower"	Steven Curtis Chapman	4:18
