= Mincaye =

Ecuadorian Huaorani preacher (c. 1935-2020)

- Born: c. 1935; Ecuador
- Died: 28 April 2020
- Citizenship: Huaorani
- Known for: Operation Auca
- Spouse: Ompodae
- Children: 13
- Relatives: Dayuma (cousin)

Mincaye Enquedi (also Mincayi, Minkayi, or Mincayani; Huao for "Wasp") (ca. 1935 - 28 April 2020) was a Huao Ecuadorian preacher and church elder. In 1956, he took part in the now infamous attack on five missionaries during Operation Auca. He is believed to have speared both Nate Saint and Ed McCully during the attack.

In 1958 Elisabeth Elliot, wife of Jim Elliot, and Rachel Saint, sister of Nate Saint, made peaceful contact with the Huaorani tribe. They came to live with them, learned their language, and taught them the Bible. Mincaye soon converted to Christianity. He eventually became a preacher and an elder in the Huao church, and became one of the most outspoken of the Huao Christians. He said of the change he saw in his tribe, "We acted badly, badly, until they brought us God's carvings (the Bible). Then, seeing His carvings and following His good trail, now we live happily and in peace."

Mincaye became especially close with Nate Saint's son Steve, who lived in the tribe for many years. Because he had killed Steve Saint's father, Mincaye felt a special responsibility in raising him. A kinship bond was developed, and Mincaye adopted Saint as his tribal son. After the Saint family came to live permanently with the Huaorani in 1995, Mincaye considered the Saint children his grandchildren.

In 1997, Mincaye travelled to the United States for the first time. He made several trips with Steve Saint where they made appearances together. In 2000 they attended Amsterdam 2000, an international evangelism conference presented by the Billy Graham Evangelistic Association. He also travelled with Steven Curtis Chapman during his "Live Out Loud" tour. Mincaye also appeared in the 2004 documentary Beyond the Gates of Splendor. He was interviewed and appeared as himself.

The 2006 film End of the Spear largely tells the story of Mincaye and Steve Saint's lives. Mincaye was portrayed by Marco Flaco as a child and Louie Leonardo as an adult. He also made a brief cameo appearance towards the end of the film, in the scene reenacting the funeral of Rachel Saint.

== Bibliography ==
- Elliot, Elisabeth, The Savage My Kinsman.
- Hitt, Russell T., Jungle Pilot
- Saint, Steve (2005), End of the Spear.
- Beyond the Gates of Splendor (documentary film)
- End of the Spear (film)
