= Meghan O'Gieblyn =

American writer

Meghan O'Gieblyn is an American writer, and essayist.

== Life ==
Meghan O'Gieblyn studied at Moody Bible Institute. She graduated from University of Wisconsin-Madison, with an MFA.

O'Gieblyn was a columnist for The Paris Review and Wired. Her work has appeared in n+1, The Threepenny Review, and Harper's Magazine.

== Bibliography ==
- Will and Attention: A Memoir (Doubleday, 2026) ISBN 9780385551571
- Interior States (Anchor, 2018)
- God, Human, Animal, Machine (2021)
- "Is It OK to Torment Non-Player Characters in Video Games?". Wired. 29.11: 30–31. November 2021.

———————
