= Steve Saint =

Ecuadorian-born American business entrepreneur, pilot and author

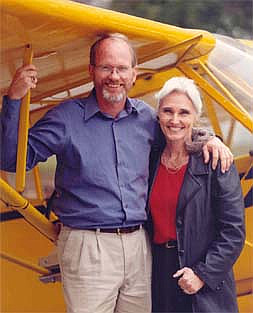
- Steve and Ginny Saint
- Born: January 30, 1951 (age 75); Quito, Ecuador
- Education: Wheaton College; College of Financial Planning
- Occupations: Entrepreneur, pilot, author
- Spouse: Virginia Lynn (Ginny) Saint
- Children: 4
- Parent(s): Nate Saint; Marj Saint Van Der Puy
- Relatives: Rachel Saint
- Website: www.itecusa.org

Stephen Farris Saint (born January 30, 1951) is an Ecuadorian-born business entrepreneur, pilot, and author. He is known for being the son of Nate Saint, a famous missionary pilot, as well as for his own work among indigenous tribes.

== Early life ==
Steve was born in Quito, Ecuador, at a mission hospital. He was the second of Nate and Marj Saint's three children. He has an older sister, Kathy, and a younger brother, Philip. The family lived in Quito where his father was a missionary pilot with Mission Aviation Fellowship. In 1956, his father and four other missionaries were killed by Waodani during Operation Auca, during a proselytizing expedition.

After the death of Saint's father, the family moved to Quito where Saint attended school. It was during this time that his aunt, Rachel Saint, and Elisabeth Elliot successfully made peaceful contact with the Waodani and were living with them in the jungle. At 10 years of age, Saint first went to live with the Waodani, staying with them during the summers. He learned about living in the jungle, and also developed relationships with many members of the tribe. In June 1965, "Babae", as he was called by the tribe, was baptized in the Curaray River by Kimo and Dyuwi, two of his father's killers who had since converted to Christianity.

== Life in the United States ==
After graduating from Alliance Academy in Quito, Steve Saint moved to the United States to attend Wheaton College where in 1973 he received a Bachelor of Arts degree in economics. Soon after graduation, he returned to Ecuador and worked for a time as a tour guide. It was there that he met and married his wife Virginia Lynn Olson (known as Ginny) who was from Minnesota and visiting Ecuador on a short-term mission team. Shortly after the birth of their first child, the Saints returned to the United States and lived in Minnesota where Saint began a successful career as a businessman. They later moved to Ocala, Florida.https://itecusa.org/steve-saint

== Return to Ecuador ==
In 1994, Rachel Saint died in Ecuador after spending 36 years with the Waorani. Saint immediately traveled to Ecuador to bury her. It was then that the Waodani tribe who had known Saint as a child asked him to move his family down to live with them. After talking the decision over with his family, he accepted the tribe's invitation, moving to the jungle in 1995. Saint worked with the Waorani to improve their living conditions by building a community center.

== Later life ==
Saint left Ecuador in 1996, feeling that his continued presence in the tribe would hinder their progression towards self-independence. He has, however, made several subsequent trips, and continued to work with the tribe. On one such trip, he was helping a group of Waodani put together their own airplane in Shell. A group of Quechua approached him and asked why they could not build an airplane for their tribe. Saint replied that they could, and this was when Saint recognized a need for a global effort aimed at teaching western skills to indigenous people. Shortly later he founded the Indigenous People's Technology and Education Center, Inc. (I-TEC) whose projects include an airworthy flying car, the I-Fly Maverick. As of 2010 Saint was seeking backing for commercial production.

Saint appeared in and narrated the 2004 documentary film Beyond the Gates of Splendor. In 2005 he published his memoirs, a book titled End of the Spear. In 2006 there was a major film adaptation of the book, and Saint was heavily involved in the production process. He was also the stunt pilot who flew the replica of his father's PA-14 in the film.

He has also authored other books including Walking His Trail.

Saint has been especially close to Mincaye, one of the Waodani tribesmen who killed his father. He and Mincaye have made several appearances together in television interviews and at Christian concerts throughout the world. Steve now often visits churches to talk about his life.

=== June 2012 injury ===
On June 13, 2012, Saint was seriously injured by a falling piece of equipment while testing it. He was partially paralyzed from the neck down and was scheduled for surgery on June 20, 2012, to relieve pressure on his spine. By September 2012 his recovery was underway. A message on his Facebook page states that he was back to work, writing newsletters by May 2013.

== Family ==
The Saints have four children — Shaun, Jaime, Jesse, and Stephenie. Shaun is a medical doctor and has four children, Jaime works for I-TEC and has six daughters, and Jesse owns Saint Aviation and has 10 children. Stephenie briefly attended the University of Florida, but died in the summer of 2000 of a sudden cerebral hemorrhage.

Today, Steve and Ginny live in Ocala, Florida, and continue to make regular trips to Ecuador.

== Works ==
=== Books ===
- The Great Omission: Fulfilling Christ's Commission Completely (2001). ISBN 1-57658-216-7
- End of the Spear (2005). ISBN 0-8423-8488-X
- Walking His Trail: Signs of God Along the Way (2007). ISBN 978-1-4143-1376-4

=== Articles ===
- "Did They Have to Die?", Christianity Today, September 16, 1996.
- The Unfinished Mission to the Aucas, ellie Christianity Today (March 3, 1998).
- Looking at Missions from Their Side, Not Ours, Mission Frontiers (May – June 1998).

=== Contributions ===
- Jungle Pilot: The Story Continues (1997), epilogue to the updated edition of Jungle Pilot: The Gripping Story of the Life and Witness of Nate Saint, Martyred Missionary to Ecuador by Russell T. Hitt, (1957).
- List of books by John Piper|Suffering and the Sovereignty of God (2006), by John Piper.

=== Other sources ===
- Stephen F. Saint Biographical Information
- Hitt, Russell T. Jungle Pilot
- Saint, Steve (2005). End of the Spear. Saltriver. ISBN 0-8423-8488-X.
- Washington Post article
- interview
- Interview with Mission Frontiers
- Profile at World View Weekend
- "Fighting Dependency among the Aucas". Interview. Network for Strategic Missions. Archived from the original on December 22, 2007.
- Remarks by Frank Wolf on the floor of the United States House of Representatives
