= Mission Aviation Fellowship =

Christian organization

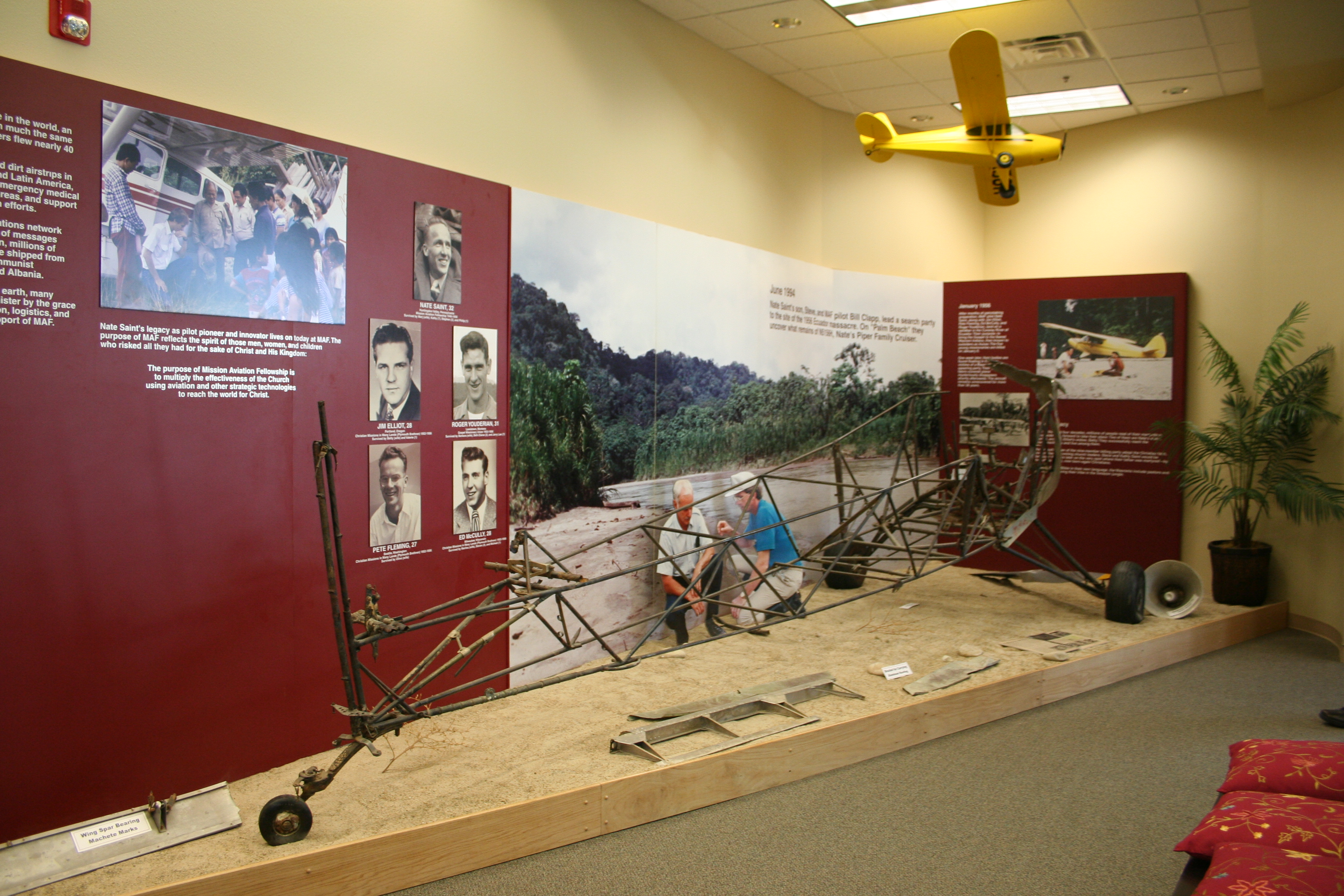
The remains of an aircraft used by Mission Aviation Fellowship missionary Nate Saint is on display at MAF-US headquarters in Nampa, Idaho

Mission Aviation Fellowship (MAF) is an Evangelical Christian organization that provides aviation, communications, and learning technology services to more than 1,000 Christian and humanitarian agencies, as well as thousands of isolated missionaries and indigenous villagers in the world's most remote areas. There are three major operational centers – Nampa, Idaho; Ashford, England; and Cairns, Australia. These centres provide operational support to programs in the Americas, Africa and Asia Pacific regions. In 2010, MAF served in more than 55 countries, flying 201,710 passengers with a fleet of some 130 aircraft.

== History ==
MAF began with several World War II pilots who had a vision for how aviation could be used to spread the Christian faith. After the War, Jim Truxton of the United States, Murray Kendon of New Zealand, and Edwin Hartwig of Australia, with the support of like-minded Christians, founded missionary aviation agencies in their respective countries.

The US organization was the first to take to the air, under the name Christian Airmen's Missionary Fellowship, later known as Mission Aviation Fellowship (MAF). In 1946, pilot Betty Greene flew the first MAF aircraft on its inaugural flight, transporting two missionaries of Wycliffe Bible Translators to a remote jungle location in Mexico. In addition to Truxton and Greene, other early members of the fellowship included Charlie Mellis, Nate Saint, Larry Montgomery, Grady Parrott, George Fisk, Clarence Soderberg, and Jim Buyers. The earliest MAF fields of service were Mexico, Peru, and Ecuador. Over the years, the organization expanded to serve many countries of Africa, Latin America, Asia, and Eurasia.

In the United Kingdom, Missionary Aviation Fellowship was initially organized as a wing of the Mildmay Movement (a Christian outreach organization), though it later became an independent organization. Murray Kendon was instrumental in the agency's founding, as were Jack Hemmings, Stuart King, and Tom Banham. MAF-UK conducted a survey of Central Africa in 1948, followed by service in Sudan in 1950. In subsequent years, the British organization expanded service to other African countries.

The organizational meeting for an Australian MAF organization was held on 30 June 1947. Early members included Edwin "Harry" Hartwig, Leonard Buck, John Nimmo, Bruce Morton and Ken Cooper. After the purchase of a de Havilland Tiger Moth aircraft in 1949, Hartwig and Alex Friend undertook a survey of northern Australia. Hartwig then completed a needs assessment survey in New Guinea. In 1951 Hartwig, along with Bob and Betty Hutchins of MAF-US, established service in New Guinea, based at Madang. On 6 August 1951, Hartwig was killed when his aircraft crashed in the Asaroka Pass in the Central New Guinea Highlands. In the years following, work in New Guinea continued through the joint efforts of the Australian and American MAF organizations. Later, the Australian MAF established service in central and north Australia (Arnhem Land), Borneo, and Bougainville.

MAF came to worldwide attention when, in 1956, MAF-US pilot Nate Saint and four other missionaries were killed on a beach in Ecuador by Huaorani. Family members of those killed returned to Ecuador and ministered to the tribe, and some of the men who killed the missionaries eventually converted to Christianity. The story was featured in Life magazine, and several feature films have been made about the life and death of these missionaries, including End of the Spear in 2005.

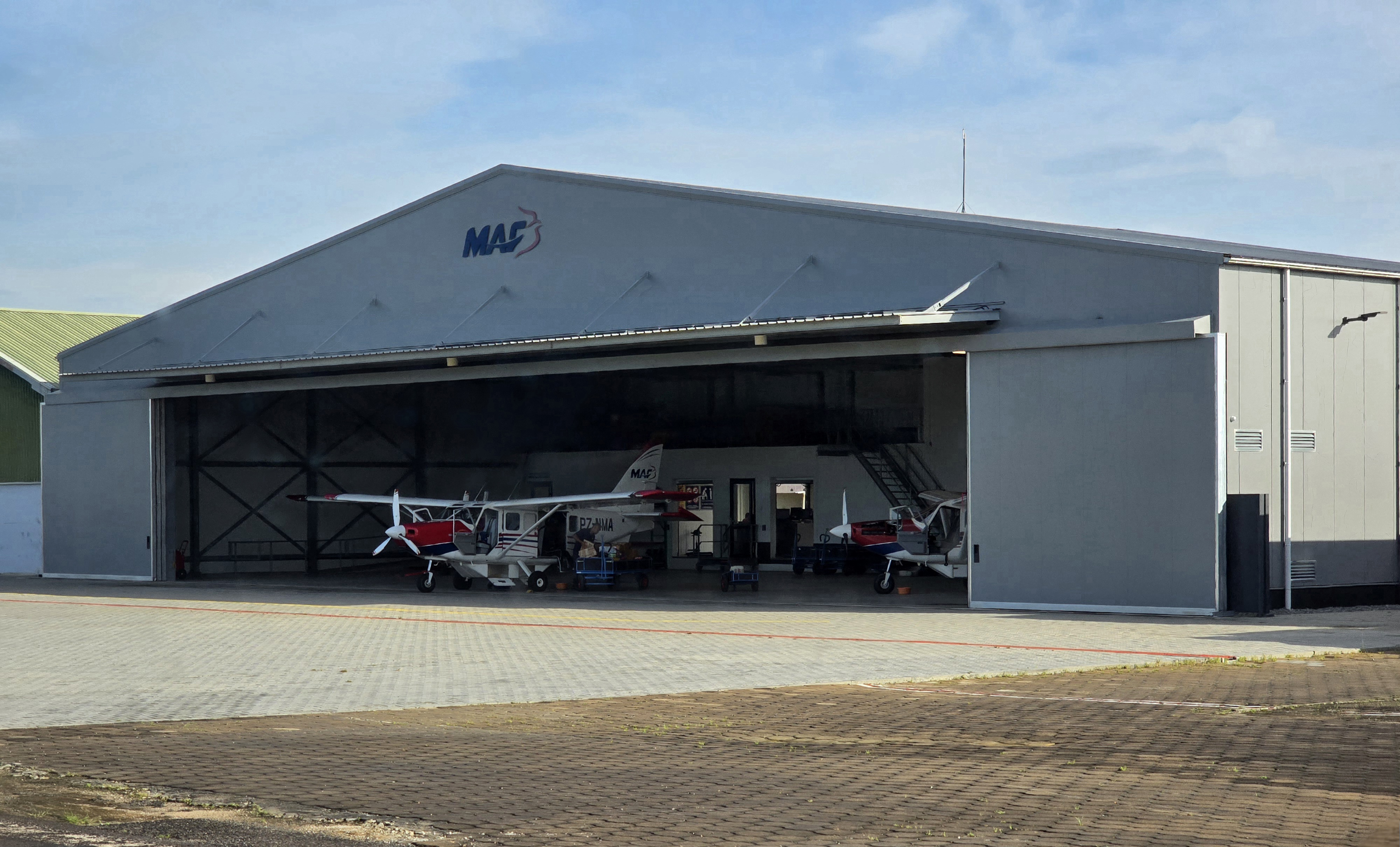
MAF Suriname on Zorg en Hoop Airport

In later years, MAF agencies were established in other countries, including New Zealand, South Africa, Suriname, Finland, the Netherlands, Sweden, Norway, Denmark, Brazil, Mexico, Colombia, and Canada.

MAF Learning Technologies developed in a similar way to the aviation support. MAF staff saw the needs of isolated church leaders which could be met with the use of various educational technologies including the internet, computers, MP3 players and other communication devices. MAF Learning Technologies is providing support to many other ministries seeking to provide leadership training, education and community development training to people in isolated areas.

== Places of service ==
MAF missionaries perform tasks as diverse as digging wells in Mali, providing disaster relief services in Sumatra, installing jungle communications and internet wifi networks in Papua New Guinea and Ecuador, operating computer centers in rural African villages, providing air ambulance services in East Timor and Haiti, and showing the movie Jesus in remote villages. Its learning technologies division provides training and biblical resources for thousands of isolated pastors and church leaders. The organization focuses its mission work in the areas of evangelism and church nurture; medical assistance; disaster response; community development; and training and development of indigenous peoples.

MAF has become well known as a provider of disaster response and relief services. Following the 2004 Indian Ocean earthquake and tsunami, MAF provided air and communications support in Sumatra to humanitarian agencies responding to the crisis. In 2007, MAF provided aid following Cyclone Sidr in Bangladesh and Hurricane Felix in Nicaragua, and worked with the World Health Organization and Centers for Disease Control and Prevention to halt an Ebola outbreak in the Democratic Republic of Congo. In 2008, MAF aircraft evacuated missionaries and foreign aid workers from Chad following violence there. That same year, MAF airdropped food and medical supplies to villagers stranded by flooding in the wake of four deadly storms in Haiti, and served refugee camps in the Democratic Republic of Congo following clashes between government and rebel forces. MAF also provided relief services in response to the January 2010 earthquake in Haiti.

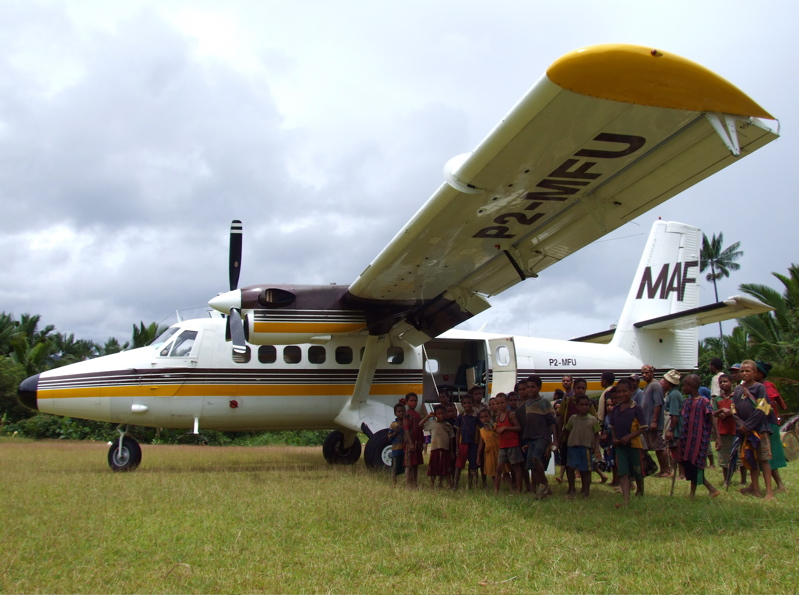
MAF PNG Twin Otter at Kafa, Papua New Guinea

MAF also provides internet, IT and RF communications to its various projects around the globe. In disasters, MAF uses a mobile VSAT terminal which can be "checked" onto most commercial airlines as baggage. This terminal can provide emergency communications anywhere in the world and can be quickly deployed.

== Accidents ==
- On 23 June 1967, a MAF Cessna 185, registration VH-MFG, was on a routine short-hop (20–25 minute) flight from Telefomin to Olsobip in Papua New Guinea with the pilot and two passengers on board when it was reported overdue after failing to radio in as scheduled. The flight involved a climb from 5500 feet (1676m) to over 9000 feet (2743m) to cross mountainous terrain, frequently shrouded in cloud, at the southern end of which is a sheer rock formation several thousand feet in height called the Hindenburg Wall. Despite an extensive 10-day search over 8000 square kilometres, neither the aircraft nor the bodies of the pilot and passengers were ever found. Some years later, an army helicopter pilot in the area reported seeing wreckage of an aircraft at the base of the Wall while overflying the area. Despite returning the following day, he was unable to re-locate the spot where the supposed wreckage had been glimpsed 24 hours earlier.
- On 22 December 1968, a Cessna 180 with registration PI-C452 operated by MAF crashed near the village of Quezon, Palawan, Philippines, killing the pilot and passenger. They were making a routine supply drop to some Australian missionaries working in the Quezon area and after making the drop experienced engine failure. The aircraft hit coconut trees and crashed approximately 100 yards from a beach where the pilot was attempting to make an emergency landing.
- On 31 December 1969, a Cessna 185 plane crashed into a mountain at high altitude while flying through a precipitous gorge. The location was in the vicinity of a New Guinea village where two missionaries were ambushed and killed on 25 September 1968. The Newmans’ 10-year-old son Paul was thrown clear of the wreckage and escaped serious injury. It is reported that the same tribesmen who had taken part in the ambush cared for the lad while he awaited rescue. When rescuers arrived, villagers were said to exclaim, "We beg you for your friendship."
- On 17 December 1994, a de Havilland Canada DHC-6 Twin Otter with registration P2-MFS crashed in Papua New Guinea while en route from Tabubil to the nearby village of Selbang. 28 people were killed, including both the crew and all passengers. The aircraft struck a mountain at an altitude of 6400 ft due to poor visibility and lack of functioning instruments.

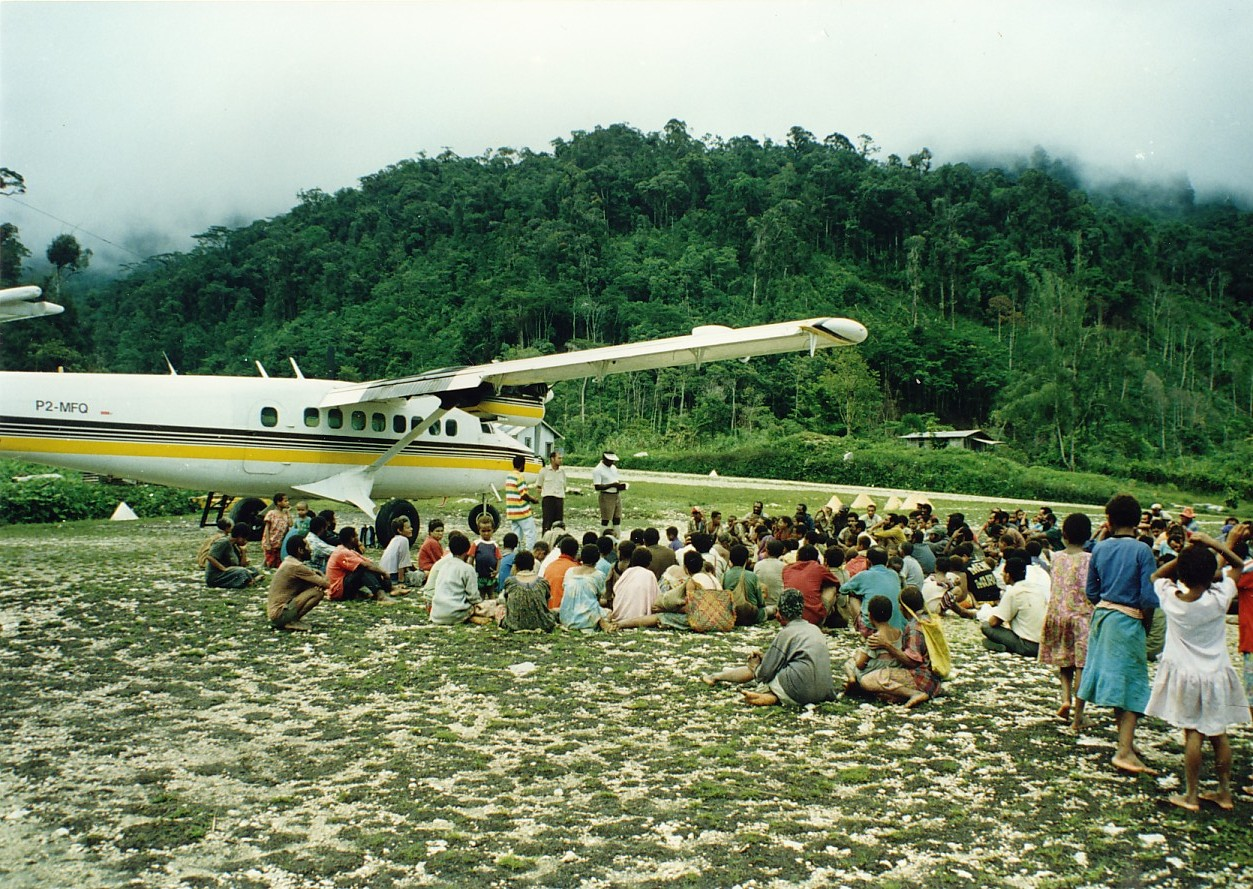
MAF Twin Otter at Selbang airstrip.

- On 22 February 2005, a de Havilland Canada DHC-6 Twin Otter with registration P2-MFQ crashed en route from Tabubil to Wobagen airstrip. The aircraft hit a mountain while the pilots were trying to find the runway at Wobagen, Papua New Guinea. The two pilots, both from New Zealand, were killed in the accident but the cabin attendant and eight passengers survived and were able to walk to the village.
- On 23 March 2006 a Cessna 206 crashed close to Tari in Papua New Guinea, killing its pilot and injuring three passengers. The pilot was a 42-year-old Swiss man who had been in PNG with the Swiss mission for 12 years. The pilot had reportedly entered the circuit area around Tari airfield, but never made it to the runway. The three passengers were PNG nationals.
- On 16 October 2008, the pilot of a GippsAero GA8 Airvan was killed when it crashed during a flight to several Australian Aboriginal communities in Arnhem Land, Australia.
- On 12 May 2020, a MAF Quest Kodiak 100 PK-MEC aircraft piloted by Joyce Lin crashed in the Lake Sentani area of Indonesia a few minutes after taking off from Dortheys Hiyo Eluay International Airport. The pilot died while making a solo flight from Jayapura to Tolikara carrying cargo.

== Aviation ==
Mission Aviation Fellowship provides transport services to missionaries, translators, support personnel, consultants, trainers and linguists; provides medical evacuations; and assists in disaster relief work. In some areas, support is also provided to many Christian mission organizations, hospitals, local people and governments. Since these services involve flying into steep, short, or otherwise difficult runways, Mission Aviation Fellowship provides its personnel with training in STOL and other specialised techniques.

Aircraft currently used include

- Cessna 172P Skyhawk
- Cessna 182 SMA Skylane
- Cessna T182JT-A Turbo Skylane
- Cessna U206F Stationair
- Cessna U206G Stationair II
- Cessna TU206G Turbo Stationair
- Cessna 208A Caravan
- Cessna 208A Caravan Amphibian
- Cessna 208B Grand Caravan
- Gippsland GA8 Airvan
- Gippsland GA8-TC320 Airvan
- Pilatus PC-6 Porter
- Quest Kodiak 100

Former aircraft

- Beech 99 Airliner
- Beechcraft Super King Air 200
- Cessna 170B
- Cessna 180* Cessna 185 Skywagon
- Cessna 185 Skywagon
- Cessna 207 Skywagon
- Cessna 210 Centurion
- de Havilland DHC-6-200 Twin Otter
- Pilatus PC-12
- Piper PA-14 Family Cruiser

Information from: Mission Aviation Fellowship Arnhem Land, Australian, Bangladesh, Canada, East Timor, Indonesia, New Zealand, Papua New Guinea, South Africa, UK & US websites and Airliners.net

== See also ==
- MAF Uganda

== Video ==
- MAF: Change Everything
- Nepal: One Flight at a Time
