= Ed McCully =

American Christian missionary (1927-1956)

Theophilus Edward "Ed" McCully
- Born: June 1, 1927; Iowa
- Died: January 8, 1956 (aged 28); Curaray River, Ecuador
- Cause of death: Murder by spearing
- Resting place: Ecuador
- Education: Wheaton College (1945–49); Marquette University Law School (1949–50); School of Missionary Medicine (1951–52)
- Occupation: Missionary
- Known for: Operation Auca
- Spouse: Marilou McCully
- Children: 3
- Parent(s): T. Edward McCully Sr., Lois Green McCully

Theophilus McCully (June 1, 1927 – January 8, 1956) was a Christian missionary to Ecuador who, along with four other missionaries, was killed while attempting to evangelize the Huaorani people, through efforts known as Operation Auca.

== Early years ==
McCully was the second oldest of three children. He grew up in Milwaukee, Wisconsin, where his father was a bakery executive. The family attended a Plymouth Brethren assembly called at that time the "Good News Chapel," but is now called "Wauwatosa Bible Chapel". McCully's father was also a church elder, who preached from the pulpit.

== College years ==
In the fall of 1945, McCully enrolled in Wheaton College where he majored in business and economics. It was also at Wheaton where he met and became good friends with Jim Elliot.

In college, McCully was an exceptional student. At 6'2" and 190 lbs., he proved to be very athletic and was on both the football and track teams. He also distinguished himself as a gifted orator, and became very popular among his classmates. His self-authored speech about U.S. Treasury Secretary Alexander Hamilton won McCully the 1949 National Hearst Oratorical Contest in San Francisco, a contest in which over 10,000 students had entered. That same year, McCully was unanimously elected senior class president.

After graduating from Wheaton in 1949, McCully entered Marquette University Law School intent on becoming a lawyer. Just before his second year there, he took a job as a hotel night clerk. Originally intending to spend the long hours studying classwork, he instead began reading more of the Bible. The biblical narrative of Nehemiah as well as his correspondence with Jim Elliot, who was making preparations to leave for Ecuador at the time, inspired McCully to consider missionary work. Finally, on September 22, 1950, the day before he was to register for his second year of school, he announced he would not be returning.

== Ministry in America ==
After dropping out of law school, McCully began a ministry in the United States. In the winter and spring of 1951, he and Jim Elliot shared a weekly Christian radio broadcast. He also travelled and spoke at various churches around the country. At one stop in Pontiac, Michigan, he met his future wife, Marilou Hobolth, a Moody Bible Institute graduate. They were married on June 29, 1951.

He then entered the School of Missionary Medicine in Los Angeles (today part of Biola University). He spent a year there studying dentistry, obstetrics, and tropical diseases and their treatments.

== Ministry in Ecuador ==
The McCullys went to Ecuador supported by Christian Missions in Many Lands (CMML). Ed, Marilou and their 8 month old son, Stevie, left for Ecuador by ship on December 10, 1952. They first stayed in Quito to finish their Spanish study, then joined Jim Elliot and Pete Fleming at their mission station in Shandia. Eventually the McCullys took up residence at the Arajuno mission station deep in the jungle. They worked with the Quechua Indians.

In the fall of 1955, McCully, along with Jim Elliot and missionary pilot Nate Saint, began Operation Auca, their plan to reach the previously un-contacted Waorani. Since the Waorani had a reputation as one of the most murderous tribes on earth, everything was done to earn their trust. The missionaries began by making gift drops from Saint's airplane. McCully would often accompany Saint on these missions.

When the missionaries felt they had built up enough of a rapport with the Waorani, they decided to land in their territory. By this time, Roger Youderian and Pete Fleming had also joined the effort. Saint was able to land the airplane on a sandbar along the Curaray River. However, after friendly ground contact with three Waorani, the missionaries were attacked by a party of six Waorani warriors and three women. McCully was the fourth of the five missionaries to be speared by a young Waorani named Mincaye, and also severely mutilated with a machete after he grabbed and tried to hold back one of his attackers. His role is described in the 2006 film End of the Spear.

Shortly afterwards, a search party was organized to find the men. McCully's body was not found by the search party, but he was presumed to be dead. Some Quechua Indians had later found his body further down stream, and even produced McCully's shoe and wristwatch as evidence.

== Surviving family ==
At the time of Ed's death, Marilou was eight months pregnant with their third son, Matt. She returned home to give birth and to meet with family. Ed McCully's memorial service was held at his home church in Wauwatosa, Wisconsin, and drew around 800 people.

Marilou eventually returned to Ecuador and lived in Quito for 6 years, running a home for missionary children. She later returned to America and settled in Washington State where she worked as a hospital bookkeeper, and served as pianist at Evergreen Bible Chapel in Federal Way, Washington. She never remarried, and died of cancer on April 24, 2004.
