= Arajuno =

Coordinates: 1°14′04″S 77°41′15″W

Eastern Ecuador

Arajuno (pronounced ar-a-HOO-no) is a jungle community in the Ecuadorian rainforest. It is also a Canton (political subdivision) in the Pastaza Province. It is located on the Arajuno River, a tributary of the Curaray. The area is inhabited by Quichua Indians.

Arajuno was built by the Shell Oil Company as a base to conduct prospecting in the area. The company employed many Quechuas to build an airstrip (ICAO: SEAR) and buildings. Shell abandoned Arajuno in 1948 when the company decided to discontinue its prospecting in Ecuador.

In the 1950s, Arajuno was used as a mission base by missionary Ed McCully.

The airstrip was needed because it was not until the late 20th century that Arajuno was accessible by road. The road to Arajuno remains a difficult ride, and it is common for people to seek other methods of transportation even today.

Today, it is the location of the Arajuno Jungle Lodge, a privately owned and operated resort. The Arajuno Road Project also operates in the schools along the road to Arajuno, supplying educational and sporting equipment and offering volunteer opportunities to assist in enhance local education.
