= Curaray River =

River in South America

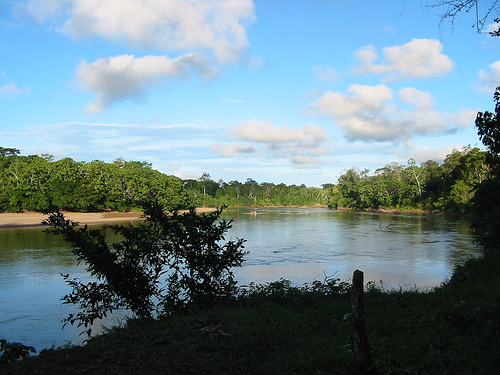

Location
- Countries: Ecuador; Peru

Physical characteristics
- Source: Andes
- Mouth: Napo River
  - coordinates: 2°21′39″S 74°5′29″W
- Length: 800 km (500 mi)
- Basin size: 26,775 km^{2} (10,338 sq mi) 26,704.7 km^{2} (10,310.7 mi^{2})
- Discharge
  - location: Curaray, Maynas, Loreto Region, Peru (near mouth)
  - average: 2,044.372 m^{3}/s (72,196.3 cu ft/s) 2,155 m^{3}/s (76,100 cu ft/s)

The Curaray River (also called the Ewenguno River or Rio Curaray) is a river in eastern Ecuador and Peru. It is a tributary of the Napo River, which is part of the Amazon basin. The land along the river is home to several indigenous people groups, including the Kichwa and Huaorani. The river itself is home to caimans and piranhas.

== "Palm Beach" ==
In 1956, on a sandbar on the Curaray, five Christian missionaries were killed by Huaorani tribespeople during Operation Auca, an attempt to evangelize the Huaorani. The missionaries' bodies were then thrown into the river. A rescue team later recovered four of the bodies and buried them in a mass grave on the river bank. The fifth, that of Ed McCully, was claimed to have been discovered downstream by a group of natives who produced McCully's wristwatch. However, his body was never located and positively identified.

The missionaries had arrived by airplane and chose the sandbar as a suitable place to land, since it was the only land area nearby clear of trees. They built a camp on the sandbar which they nicknamed "Palm Beach". They also built a treehouse nearby.

After the attack, the Huaorani stripped the plane of its fabric skin. The plane was then abandoned and left to the river. It disappeared, and was not discovered until 1994. Someone was walking along the sandbar and noticed a piece of bare metal sticking out of the sand. It was later discovered to be part of the metal framework of the Piper aircraft flown by Nate Saint. The river had almost completely buried its remains in the sand. The framework of the plane is now displayed in the headquarters of the Mission Aviation Fellowship.

Today, the Huaorani Christian community often use the Curaray River as a site for baptisms. Steve Saint and his children were all baptized there.

The area is posited to be the origin of criollo cacao, the most rare type.
