= Waorani people =

Indigenous people in Ecuador

Waorani
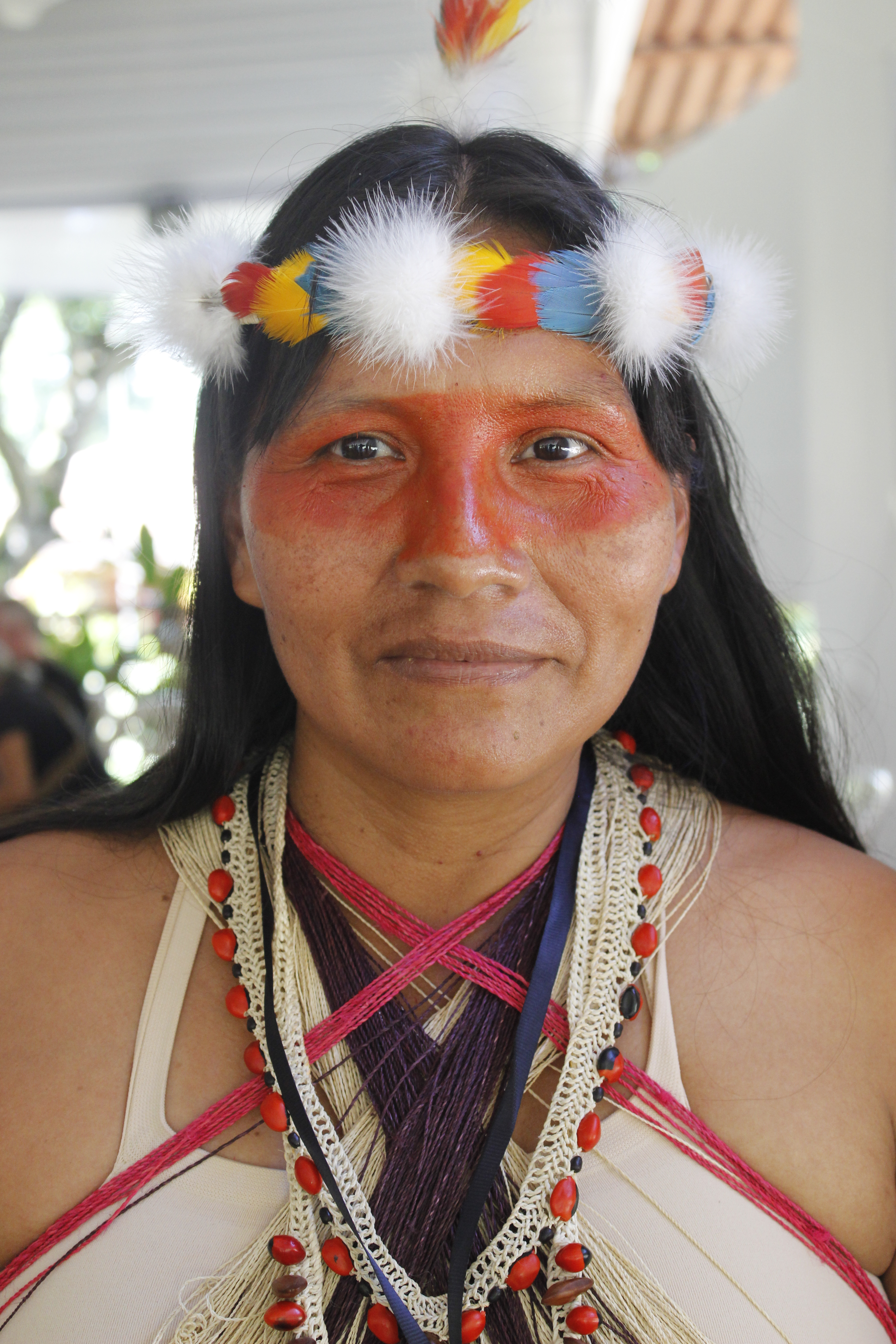
- Waorani leader Alicia Cawiya

Total population
- approx. 2,500 (various post-2001 est.)

Regions with significant populations
- Waorani settlements: approx. 4,000. Nomadic "uncontacted": Tagaeri, Taromenane, Huiñatare, and Oñamenane: approx. 250.

Languages
- Waorani, Spanish

Religion
- Animism, Christianity

Related ethnic groups
- Kichwa, Shuar, Achuar, Siona, Secoya, Shiwiar, Záparo, Cofán

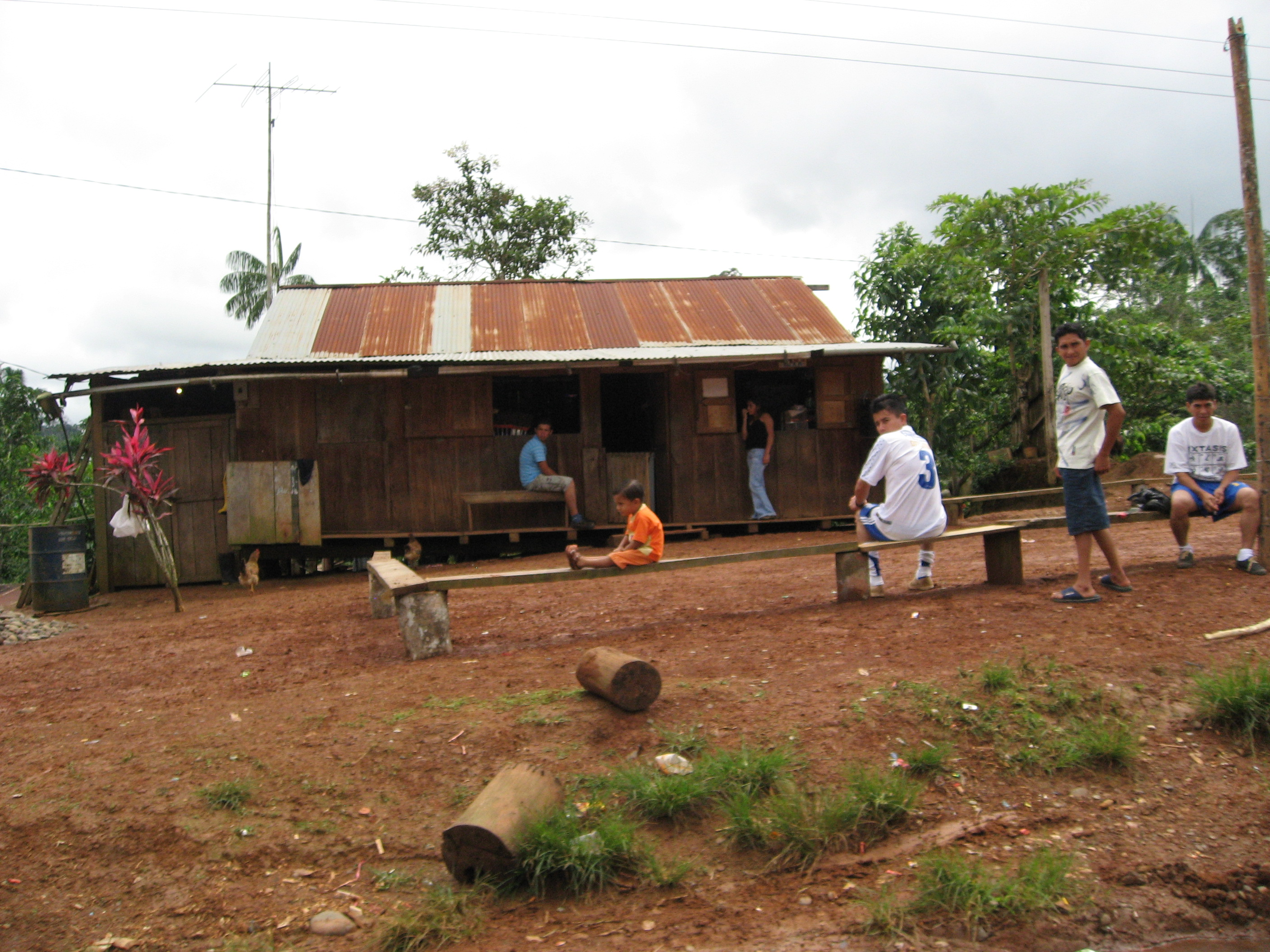
A Waorani village in Ecuador.

The Waorani, Waodani, or Huaorani, also known as the Waos, are an Indigenous people from the Amazonian Region of Ecuador (Napo, Orellana, and Pastaza Provinces) who have marked differences from other ethnic groups from Ecuador.

They comprise almost 4,000 inhabitants and speak the Waorani language, also known as Huoarani, Wao, and Sapela, a linguistic isolate that is not known to be related to any other language.

Their ancestral lands are located between the Curaray and Napo rivers, about 80 km (50 miles) south of El Coca. Since the 1940s, Their territory, approximately 190 km (120 miles) wide and 120–160 km (75 to 100 miles) from north to south, has been threatened by the oil industry and illegal logging. In the past, Waorani were able to protect their culture and lands from both indigenous enemies and settlers by force of arms.

In the last 60 years, they were forced to shift from a hunting and gathering society to living mostly in permanent forest settlements. As many as five communities, the Tagaeri, the Huiñatare, the Oñamenane, and two groups of the Taromenane, remain in voluntary isolation.

== Etymology ==
The word Waorani (plural of Wao 'person') means 'humans' or 'men' in Wao. Before the mid 20th century, it included only those kin associated with the speaker. Others in the ethnic group were called Waodoni, while outsiders are known by the term Cowodi (also written cowodi or cuwudi).

The name Waorani (or the alternative English spelling Waodani) represents a transliteration by English-speaking missionary linguists. The phonetic equivalent used by Spanish-speakers is Huaorani (reflecting the absence of w in Spanish spelling). The sounds represented by the English and Spanish letters d and r are allophones in the Waorani language (also known as Sabela, Wao Terero).

The alternate name Auca is a pejorative exonym used by the neighboring Quechua persons, and commonly adopted by Spanish-speakers as well. Auca (awqa in Quechua) means 'savage', which also gives the name to the Sociedad Deportiva Aucas football club.

== History ==
=== 18th century until 1940s ===
There is indication of contact between the Waorani and "travelers and explorers in Waorani territory" related to rubber extraction in the 18th, 19th and 20th centuries, which were marked by violence and exploitation. In particular, evidence points at increased contact between Waorani persons and other non-indigenous persons during the rubber boom in the Putumayo region period between 1879 and 1911, also known as the Putumayo genocide. Peruvian, Colombia, French and Italian rubber traders started establishing rubber exploitation sites in the 1850s in the Ecuadorian Amazon. Research indicates that, "before 1910, the Waorani sometimes collected rubber to trade with traders in the lower Curaray River basin", but that they were also captured, enslaved, and forced to work in rubber haciendas. According to Javier Martínez-Sastre:

"The Huaorani, likely cornered by other more powerful peoples from the north (Napo) and the Zápara from the south, would have remained, for a long time, “hidden” and protected from the white-mestizo penetration in very inaccessible places between the Napo and Curaray rivers. Possibly due to the pressure exerted from the north by the groups expelled to the interior of the Napo riverbanks after the arrival of the Spanish, and because in the south the Zápara population of the Curaray had been considerably reduced due to diseases from contact with the white-mestizo society and to interethnic violence, the Huaorani gradually moved into this territory and occupied the banks of the Curaray up to its headwaters (Cabodevilla, 2009). Although the exact chronology of the Huaorani's arrival at the Curaray River is unknown, what seems clear is that during the 18th and 19th centuries this ethnic group expanded throughout the left bank of the Curaray River (Cabodevilla, 1999: 162-163). And with the impact of rubber activity on the local populations, the Curaray River was, from 1930 onwards, practically depopulated of anyone other than these "aucas" (Reeve, 2002: 15)."

The extreme violence and brutality of the rubber period in the area diminished after Roger Casement published his reports on the enslaved workforce collecting rubber for the Peruvian Amazon Company (PAC), which had been registered in Britain in 1907 and had a British board of directors and numerous stockholders, but did not disappear. Narváez and Trujillo have listed 15 attacks and deaths involving the Waorani between 1918 and 1949, including nine incidents related to the continued rubber extraction, particularly an infamous rubber hacienda of Carlos Sevilla. Starting in the 1940s, there is an increasing number of violent incidents between Waoranis and the oil exploration operations. In one 1920 incident, a group of Waoranis attacked a rubber expedition of Carlos Sevilla along the Curaray river. In reprisal, 80 Waoranis were killed or kidnapped. The kidnapping and enslavement of indigenous persons was a common feature of the rubber industry in the Amazon at the time.

The rubber era and its brutality has marked the Waorani oral tradition and language, with tales of armed foreigners kidnapping, killing, and committing acts of cannibalism. In fact, in the Waorani language, outsiders are known as Cowodi (also written cowodi or cuwudi), which also means "cannibal", reflecting the traumatic conflict with outsiders during the 19th and early 20th century over the rubber boom. Today, cowodi is abandoning its negative connotation. "This change in perceptions of the signifier cowudi reveals a process of cultural change among the Huaorani that has allowed tourism, oil, colonization, and NGO activities to take place."

With the end of the rubber boom in the 1930s, "most Waorani did not choose voluntary isolation but instead followed the Runa [Kichwa People], who retreated to the western edges of the rainforest. From there, the Waorani raided Kichwa settlements to steal steel tools and, occasionally, captives. Simultaneously, violence among Waorani families increased." In 1946, people working for the Carlos Sevilla hacienda kidnapped two women of the Moipa group in the Upper Curaray river and, in 1948, they kidnapped four more women of the Moipa group, including Dayuma, who would later become central to the history of the Waorani people.

=== 1950s ===
Missionaries of the Summer Institute of Linguistics (SIL) first arrived in Ecuador in 1952 with the objective of evangelizing the Waorani, and eventually met Dayuma in the hacienda. It was there that she was befriended by an American missionary named Rachel Saint, who took interest in learning the Huaorani language, "Huao Terero".

In 1955, the missionaries launched Operation Auca to force contact with the Waorani, with the support of oil companies willing to expand exploration, most notably Royal Dutch Shell and Texaco. On 6 January 1956, a group of Waorani killed five US missionaries of Operation Auca in Playa Palma within Waorani territory, where they had landed and established a temporary base. The five missionaries were Jim Elliot, Nate Saint, Ed McCully, Peter Fleming, and Roger Youderian. In 1957, Rachel Saint, whose brother was killed in the January 1956 attack, embarked on a tour of the United States together with Dayuma, one of the first contacted Waorani persons, appearing with Billy Graham at Madison Square Garden and on Ralph Edwards' television show This Is Your Life, thus turning the conversion of the Waoranis into a cause célèbre in the United States, increasing donations and support for evangelism efforts in Ecuador.

Subsequently, presence and activity of SIL grew in Ecuador and, in 1968, SIL signed a formal agreement with the Ecuadorian Government to "pacify the savages" and establishing a 1,600 km² "protectorate" in Limoncocha and Tiweno, covering the western part of Waorani territory. It aimed at concentrating and evangelizing the Waorani population, which "triggered profound changes: forced displacement, loss of territory, and a significant decline in their population due to disease." By 1972, most Waorani had been concentrated in Tiweno to be converted, with the groups from the lower Cononaco river, who lived near the Yasuní and Nashiño rivers (nampaweiris, waneiris, baiwairis, kempereiris) remaining.

The Waorani population before the 1950s contact was estimated at at least 600 persons, but contact with the SIL missionaries, oil workers, loggers and other indigenous peoples introduced diseases like influenza, tuberculosis, malaria, and polio, which were deadly for the until then isolated Waorani. Waorani accounts indicate that those remaining in their territory believed it was the SIL missionaries who "poisoned the chicha" and that "God is bad because he let [them] die". In 1969, "a deadly polio epidemic hit the missionary compound [...] immediately following the arrival of the third Waorani group, killing 16 and permanently handicapping many more; several authors argue that SIL was directly responsible for this outbreak due to inadequate vaccinations and sanitation while at the same time concentrating a large population in such a small area." Records indicate that approximately 525 Waoranis were concentrated in the SIL "protectorate", over 80% of their pre-contact population, "confined to a small area, living sedentary, missionary dependent lives."

Resistance to evangelism before 1968 and then to concentration in the "protectorate" was constant, with violent conflict erupting between different groups of the Waorani, attacks against oil workers and against persons of other indigenous peoples living in the area. In 1968, the Waorani leader Tagae and other families separated refused to be displaced to the missionary settlement, and have since lived in voluntary isolation. Today, they are referred to as the Tagaeri, an indigenous group living in voluntary isolation. In 1972 "Waorani leaders like Wiñame and Dabo rebelled and founded new settlements in places like Dayuno."

Facing a decrease in population in the "protectorate" due to death of flight, in 1976, the SIL missionaries called the missionary anthropologist James Yost to "explain the reasons for the failed reduction. Yost recommended dispersing the groups (some clans had already become enemies and left the reserve). He also suggested SIL's withdrawal from Tiweno 'so that the Waorani can decide their own destiny'", admitting in 1978 that "if the Waorani were to solve their own problems and remain independent of SIL, they would need to face their problems alone." SIL would then progressively reduce its presence in the "protectorate".

However, the Ecuadorian Government had declared the Waorani territory as vacant and started leasing it to oil companies, in particular Texaco, and handed property right to "colonizers" under the 1977 Law on Colonization of the Amazon Region, causing further conflicts. Faced with dispossession, many Waorani men turned to working for the oil companies or leaving their territory entirely. "By the end of 1979, James Yost counted more than seventy men [in the "protectorate"] (sixty percent of the total) who had worked for oil companies at least once, compared with thirty-three a year earlier and fewer than ten before 1977. Thirteen single girls were working as domestic servants in cities."

By the 1980s, SIL activities in Ecuador, not only in the Amazon, were a matter of national concern, with indigenous leaders calling for their expulsion from the country. In May 1981, Blanca Chancoso, leader of the Confederación de Pueblos de la Nacionalidad Kichwa del Ecuador (Ecuarunari) stated that "for a long time we have been denouncing these facts and the damage [SIL] have caused to our indigenous communities throughout the country", and demanded they be expelled from Ecuador. The left-wing president of Ecuador of the time Jaime Roldós Aguilera expelled SIL by Decree 1159 of 22 May 1981, among mounting allegations of espionage in favour of oil companies and of SIL's collaboration with the CIA in Latin America. Reacting to the expulsion, in November 1981, local activists stated to the International Work Group for Indigenous Affairs (IWGIA) that "from its inception in 1952, the Institute's activities have been linked to those of oil companies, which used SIL's policies to confine the indigenous peoples of the Amazon to a tenth of their original territory. Its educational work has had a profound impact on the way of life of the contacted groups, resulting in the disintegration of the indigenous worldview and a process of forced assimilation into mainstream society, which has led to the impoverishment of a large number of indigenous people. Recently, SIL has attempted to expand its reach to other groups living on the coast and in the highlands."

In 1986, SIL unsuccessfully tried to renegotiate its entry into the country. Nevertheless, some SIL missionaries returned to Ecuador and their influence continued, specially that of Rachel Saint, who is said to have controlled access to Tiweno, allegedly barring anybody who was not a member of SIL, up until her death in 1994.

SIL has been accused of ethnocide against the Waorani people in Ecuador and of colluding with oil companies to dispossess the Waorani people of their territory for oil exploration and exploitation. "The violent process of forced displacement, acculturation, ethnocide, and the spread of diseases, imposed by SIL under the shadow of oil interests, is possibly one of the most profound and dramatic changes that the Waorani people have experienced in their history."

== Tribal subgroups ==
The Waorani are subdivided into the Toñampare, Quenahueno, Tihueno, Quihuaro, Damuintaro, Zapino, Tigüino, Huamuno, Dayuno, Quehueruno, Garzacocha (río Yasuní), Quemperi (río Cononaco) Mima, Caruhue (río Cononaco) and Tagaeri.

== Culture ==
=== Worldview ===
In traditional animist Waorani worldview, there is no distinction between the physical and spiritual worlds, and spirits are present throughout the world. The Waorani once believed that the entire world was a forest (and used the same word, ömë, for both). The Oriente's rainforest remains the essential basis of their physical and cultural survival. For them, the forest is home, while the outside world is considered unsafe.

In short, as one Waorani put it, "The rivers and trees are our life." In all its specificities, the forest is woven into each Waorani life and conceptions of the world. They have detailed knowledge of its geography and ecology. The Huaorani evolved to have very flat feet, which help them climb trees.

Hunting supplies a major part of the Waorani diet and is of cultural significance. Before a hunting or fishing party ensues, the community shaman will often pray for a day to ensure its success. Traditionally, the creatures hunted were monkeys, birds, and wild peccaries, as there was an extensive collection of hunting and eating taboos, for example prohibiting the consumption of deer, on the grounds that deer eyes look similar to human eyes. Neither land-based predators nor birds of prey are hunted. While a joyful activity, hunting has ethical ramifications: "The Guarani [Waorani] must kill animals to live, but they believed dead animal spirits live on and must be placated or else do harm in angry retribution." To counterbalance the offense of hunting, a shaman demonstrated respect through the ritual preparation of the poison, curare, used in blow darts. Hunting with such darts is not considered killing, but retrieving, essentially a kind of harvesting from the trees.

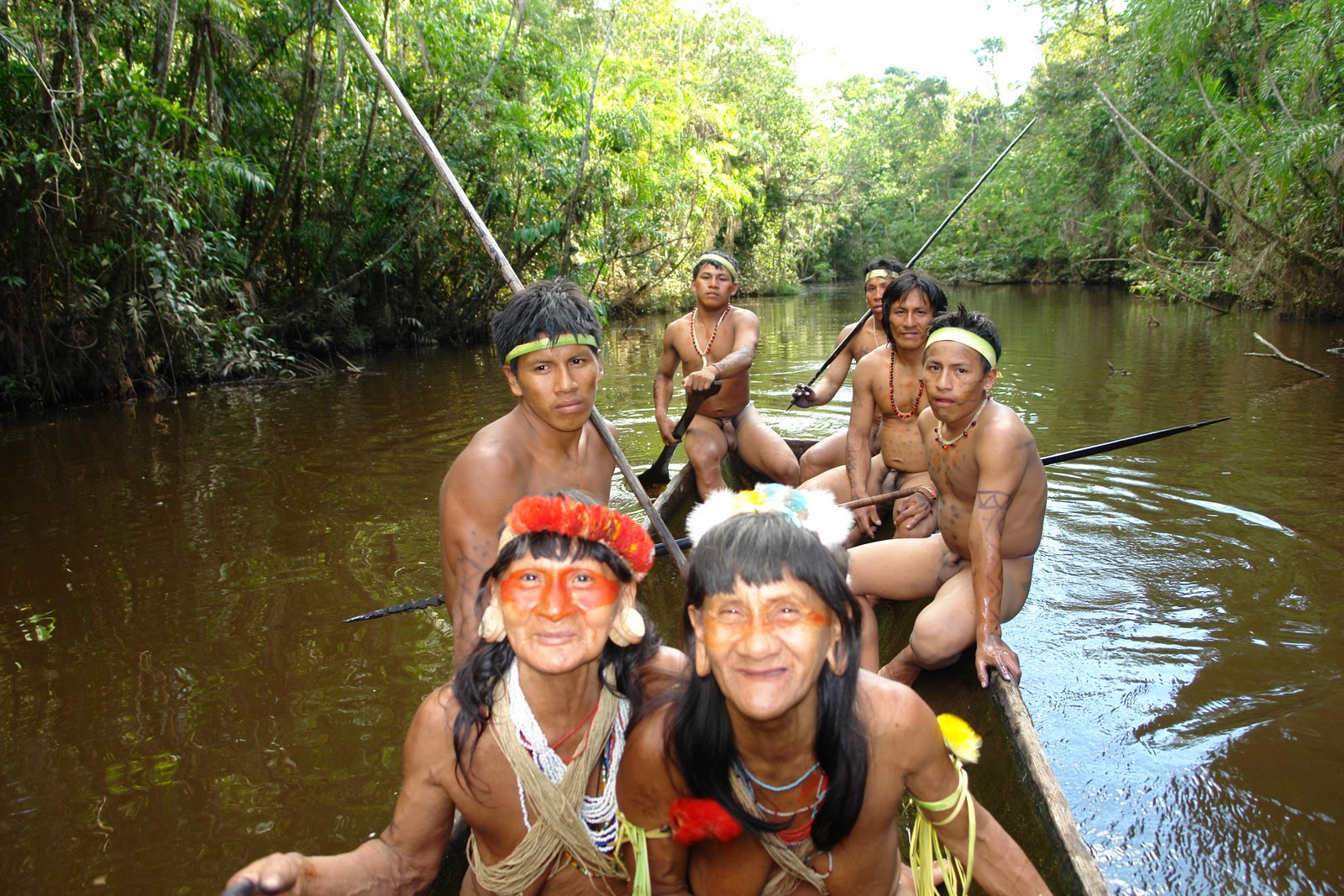
Huaorani men and women in Orellana Province

Plants, especially trees, continue to hold an important interest for the Waorani. Their store of botanical knowledge is extensive, ranging from knowledge of materials to poisons to hallucinogens to medicines. They also relate plants to their own experiences, particularly that of growing. Certain kinds of tree are considered auspicious by the Waorani. Canopy trees, with their distinctly colored young leaves and striking transformation as they mature to towering giants, are "admired for their solitary character... as well as for their profuse entanglement" with other plants. Other significant trees are the pioneer species of the peach palm (used for making spears and blowguns, as well as for fruit), and fast-growing balsa wood, used for ceremonial purposes. Peach palm trees are associated with past settlements and the ancestors who live there.

Shamanic ethnomedicine uses the ayahuasca beverage and a newly identified mushroom (Dictyonema huaorani) with the analogous substance of Psilocybe genus.

The use of Waorani as a term for their entire culture emerged in the last fifty years in a process of ethnogenesis. This was accelerated by the creation of ONHAE, a radio service, and a soccer league.

=== Weapons ===
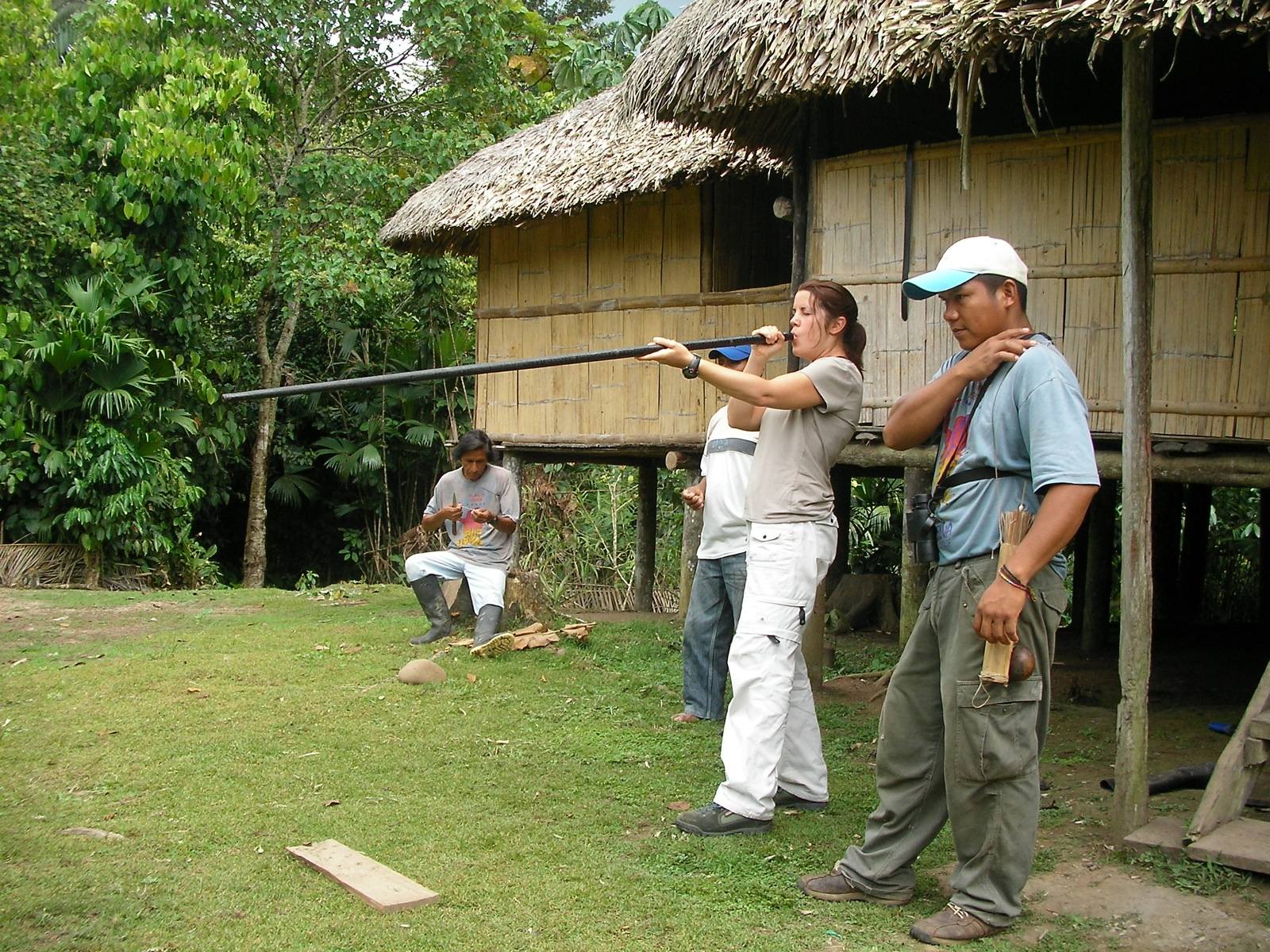
A Huaorani blowgun

The main hunting weapon is the blowgun. These weapons are typically from 3 to 4 meters long. The arrows used are dipped in curare poison, which paralyzes the muscles of the animal with which it is hit, so that it cannot breathe. Kapok fluff is used to create an air-tight seal, by twisting the fibers around the end of the dart or arrow. With the introduction of Western technology in the 20th century, many Waorani now use rifles for hunting.

== Land rights ==
In 1990, the Waorani won the rights to the Waorani Ethnic Reserve, constituting 6,125.60 km^{2} (2,365.11 sq mi). The protected status of Yasuní National Park, which overlaps with the Waorani reserve, provides some measure of environmental protection. In August 2023, Ecuadorians approved a referendum to stop oil drilling in the Park.

== Notable people ==
- Nemonte Nenquimo: Prominent leader and activist who won the 2020 Goldman Environmental Prize and was named to the TIME 100 list of most influential people. She led a successful legal battle against the Ecuadorian government to protect over 500,000 acres of Waorani territory from oil exploitation.
- Alicia Cawiya: Leader who has served as the vice-president of the National Waorani Federation (NAWE) and is a founder of the Asociación de Mujeres Waorani del Ecuador (Ecuador Waorani Women Association).
- Dayuma: Central figure in the Operation Auca, first Waorani person to convert to Christianity, as well as the missionaries' main interlocutor with other Waorani persons.
- Mincaye Enquedi (Mincayi, Minkayi, or Minkayani, Wao for "Wasp"): One of the six men who attacked the missionaries at Palm Beach. He became a Christian as well as an elder in the Waorani church. He was prominent during his trip to the United States alongside Steve Saint. The 2006 film End of the Spear focuses mainly on his life.

== See also ==
- Beyond the Gates of Splendor, 2005 documentary.
- List of Waorani people
- Operation Auca
- Steve Saint

== Literature ==
- Kane, Joe (1995), Savages, Alfred A. Knopf, ISBN 0-679-41191-7
- Long, Kathryn T. (2019). God in the Rainforest: A Tale of Martyrdom and Redemption in Amazonian Ecuador. New York: Oxford University Press. ISBN 9780190608989.
- Man, John (1982). Jungle Nomads of Ecuador: The Waorani. Time-Life Books. ISBN 978-0-7054-0704-5
- Rival, Laura (1993), "The Growth of Family Trees: Understanding Huaorani Perceptions of the Forest", Man, 28 (December): 635–52, doi:10.2307/2803990, JSTOR 2803990.
- Rival, Laura (2002), Trekking through History. The Huaorani of Amazonian Ecuador, New York: Columbia University Press, ISBN 978-0-231-11845-3.
- Rival, Laura M (2016). Huaorani transformations in twenty-first-century Ecuador: treks into the future of time. Tucson: University of Arizona Press. ISBN 978-0-8165-0119-9.
- Robarchek, Clayton; Robarchek, Carole (2008) [2002], Waorani: the Contexts of Violence and War, Mason, Ohio: Cengage Learning, ISBN 978-0-15-503797-7.
- Seamans, Joe (1996), "The Last Shaman", Nova, PBS.
- Wierucka, Aleksandra (2015). Huaorani of the western snippet. New York: Palgrave MacMillan. ISBN 978-1-137-53987-8.
- Lawrence Ziegler-Otero ( 2004), Resistance in an Amazonian Community; Huaorani Organizing against the Global Economy. Berghahn Books, New York, ISBN 1-57181-448-5
