= Nate Saint =

American Christian missionary killed in Ecuador (1923–1956)

- Born: August 30, 1923 near Hershey, Pennsylvania, United States
- Died: January 8, 1956 (aged 32); Curaray River, Ecuador
- Cause of death: Speared
- Education: Wheaton College
- Occupation: Missionary pilot
- Spouse: Marjorie Saint (née Farris) (m. Feb. 14, 1948; d. 2004)
- Children: 3, including Steve Saint
- Parent(s): Lawrence Saint; Katherine Saint
- Relatives: Rachel Saint (Sister); Sam Saint (Brother)

Nathanael Saint (August 30, 1923 – January 8, 1956) was an evangelical Christian missionary pilot who, along with four others, was killed in Ecuador while attempting to evangelize the Huaorani people through efforts known as Operation Auca.

== Early life ==
Saint was born in 1923. When he was seven he took his first plane ride with his brother Sam, who would eventually become a commercial pilot for American Airlines. While in the airplane he discovered a love of flying. His family was somewhat unusual. His brothers made a sleeping patio on the roof of their home, and his father built a roller coaster in the backyard. When he joined the army he was stationed in Las Vegas, Nevada, but was transferred to several other locations over the years. A leg injury caused him some problems while he was in the army. About a year before he was discharged, he nearly died while climbing a mountain in Yosemite National Park.

== Becoming a missionary ==
When Saint was asked by a friend to fix a plane somewhere in Mexico, he agreed. After he repaired the plane, he discovered a need for his skill in the field of mission work and also a new awareness of the value of missions. After going to Wheaton College, Saint married Marjorie Farris (commonly called Marj) in 1948 and eventually moved to Shell, Ecuador. Here, Saint built his family a house which would also serve as a guesthouse and a radio center with the other missionaries.

== Operation Auca ==
In September 1955, Saint was joined by his teammates, Jim Elliot, Ed McCully, Pete Fleming, and Roger Youderian. Saint finally found a Huaorani (also known as Auca) settlement while searching by air. To reach the tribe, Saint and the team lowered gifts to the Huaorani in a bucket tied to the plane. The team decided to try to meet the Huaorani on the ground; and, on January 3, 1956, using the beach as a landing strip, they set up camp four miles from the Huaorani settlement. Their initial contact was encouraging; however, on Sunday, January 8, 1956, the entire team was killed on the beach (known as "Palm Beach") when armed Huaorani met and speared them. Saint was the third of the five missionaries to be speared to death.

Saint and the other four men became famous worldwide as a result. Life magazine published a photo essay on the story, which was also covered in Reader's Digest and many other publications. A small school for missionary children in Shell, Ecuador, bore Saint's name for 51 years until the school closed in 2017 due to falling enrollment.

Rachel, Saint's sister, continued the mission efforts to the Huaorani. This resulted in many of these natives becoming Christians, including those who had killed Saint.

In 1966, Marjorie (Marj) Farris Saint married Abe Van Der Puy, president of HCJB World Radio. Van Der Puy died in 2003, and Marj died in 2004, from cancer. She is buried in Highland Memorial Park, south of Ocala, Florida.

Saint's older son, Steve, spent time as a child visiting his missionary family members and friends and getting to know the Huaorani. Steve was baptized by Mincaye, who was the very man who killed his father but later converted. As of 2006, Steve Saint works with the Huaorani people and travels around the world, preaching the gospel, often accompanied by Mincaye. A documentary based on the story, Beyond Gates of Splendor, was released in 2002. In 2006, a feature film, End of the Spear, was released on January 20, a week and a half after the 50-year anniversary of the killings. Steve Saint also helped write Jungle Pilot, based on his father's diary about his time in Ecuador and work with the Huaorani Indians. Steven Curtis Chapman wrote the song "No Greater Love" from his album Declaration as a tribute to Saint and his fellow missionaries.

== Bibliography ==
- Biographical sketch, Anglican.
- Hitt, Russell T (1997), Jungle Pilot, ISBN 978-1-57293-022-3.
- Saint, Steve (2005), End of the Spear, ISBN 978-0-8423-6439-3.
- End of The Spear (movie), archived from the original on March 3, 2015.
