= Yasuni =

Yasuni can mean:

- Yasuní National Park, Ecuador
  - Yasuní-ITT Initiative, a proposal to refrain from exploiting oil reserves within the park
- Yasuní River, in Ecuador
- Yasuni antwren, a bird
- Lophostoma yasuni, a species of bat
- Osteocephalus yasuni, a species of frog

== See also ==
- Yasu (disambiguation)
- Yasunia, a genus of flowering plants
