= Wao Terero =

Language isolate of Ecuador

- Sabela, Awishiri, Wao Tededo
- Wao Terero
- Native to: Ecuador, Peru
- Region: Oriente or Ecuadorian Amazon
- Ethnicity: 1,800 Waorani people (2012)
- Native speakers: 2,000 (2004)
- Language family: Language isolate
- Dialects: Tiwakuna; Tiwituey (Tuei); Shiripuno

Official status
- Official language in: Ecuador: indigenous languages official in own territories

Language codes
- ISO 639-3: auc
- Glottolog: waor1240
- ELP: Waorani
- Waotededo is classified as Vulnerable by the UNESCO Atlas of the World's Languages in Danger.

Wao Terero, the Waorani (Huaorani) language, earlier also known as Sabela and Awishiri (also Wao, Huao, Auishiri, Aushiri, Ssabela; pejorative: "Auka", "Auca"), is a language isolate spoken by the Waorani people, an Indigenous people living in the Amazon rainforest between the Napo and Curaray Rivers in Ecuador. It is considered Vulnerable by the UNESCO Atlas of the World's Languages in Danger. A small number of speakers among uncontacted groups may live in Peru.

== Classification ==
Wao Terero is not known to be related to any other language. However, it forms part of Terrence Kaufman's (2007) Yaguan branch of his Záparo-Yaguan proposal. Marcelo Jolkesky (2016) also identifies a number of lexical similarities with Yaruro.

== Status ==
Multiilingalism is more common among the younger generations; monolinguals in Wao Terero tend to be elderly, and the number of Spanish monolinguals is increasing, as is bilingualism in Spanish, Shuar, and Lowland Kichwa. Wao Terero is considered endangered due to growing bilingualism in Kichwa and Spanish and diminishing Wao Terero usage among youth.

== Geographical distribution ==
Wao Terero is primarily spoken in the Waorani Ethnic Reserve, which is the largest indigenous reserve in Ecuador. Other areas where it is spoken include Pastaza and Napo provinces (including the towns of Puyo and Coca), Yasuní National Park, and the Taromenani Tagaeri Intangible Zone.

== Dialects ==
The Taromenani ‘people living at the end of the path’ are viewed as "culturally and linguistically “similar but different” from the Waorani". Speakers of the language distinguish variation across communitnes, such as variation in the realization of nasal spreading.

== Phonology ==
=== Phonotactics ===
The syllable structure of Wao Terero is (C)V, with frequent vowel sequences.

=== Consonants ===
The alveolar tap [ɾ] is an allophone of /d/, though written separately, and the palatal stop [ɟ] is an allophone of /j/. Nasal consonants are considered "semi-phonemic", as nasalization is, in some instances, clearly allophonic due to progressive, or rightward, nasalization.

		Bilabial	Alveolar	Palatal	Velar
Plosive	Voiceless	p	t		k
Plosive	Voiced	b	d~ɾ ⟨d, r⟩		ɡ
Nasal		(m w̃)	(n)	(ɲ ⟨ñ⟩)	(ŋ ⟨ng⟩)
Approximant		w		ɟ~j ⟨y⟩	

=== Vowels ===
Wao Terero distinguishes oral and nasal vowels, which are sometimes written using a diaeresis. Phonetic vowel length occurs, and appears contrastive, but is analyzed as sequences of two of the same vowel, sometimes thought to be due to consonant elision between vowels. Creaky-voiced or laryngeal vowels also occur at word and phrase boundaries, but their phonemic status is uncertain.

	Front		Back	
	Oral	Nasal	Oral	Nasal
Close	i	ĩ		
Mid	e	ẽ	o	õ
Open	æ ⟨e⟩	æ̃ ⟨ẽ⟩	a	ã

=== Suprasegmentals ===
Stress in Wao Terero is predictable, as in CVV syllables (where C is a wildcard symbol for any consonant and V is a wildcard for any vowel), stress falls on the final syllable, but in CV syllables, it falls on the penultimate syllable.

== Morphology ==
=== Pronouns ===
Wao Terero distinguishes inclusive pronouns and singular, dual, and plural number.

== Bibliography ==
- Campbell, Lyle. (1997). American Indian Languages: The Historical Linguistics of Native America. New York: Oxford University Press. ISBN 0-19-509427-1.
- Kaufman, Terrence. (1990). Language History in South America: What We Know and How to Know More. In D. L. Payne (Ed.), Amazonian Linguistics: Studies in Lowland South American languages (pp. 13–67). Austin: University of Texas Press. ISBN 0-292-70414-3.
- Kaufman, Terrence. (1994). The Native Languages of South America. In C. Mosley & R. E. Asher (Eds.), Atlas of the World's Languages (pp. 46–76). London: Routledge.
- Peeke, M. Catherine. (2003). A Bibliography of the Waorani of Ecuador. SIL International. Retrieved 2021 April 4 from https://www.sil.org/resources/archives/7801
- Pike, Evelyn G and Rachel Saint. 1988. Workpapers Concerning Waorani discourse features. Dallas, TX: SIL.
- Rival, Laura. Trekking through History: The Huaorani of Amazonian Ecuador, Columbia University Press, 2002.
