= China–Ecuador relations =

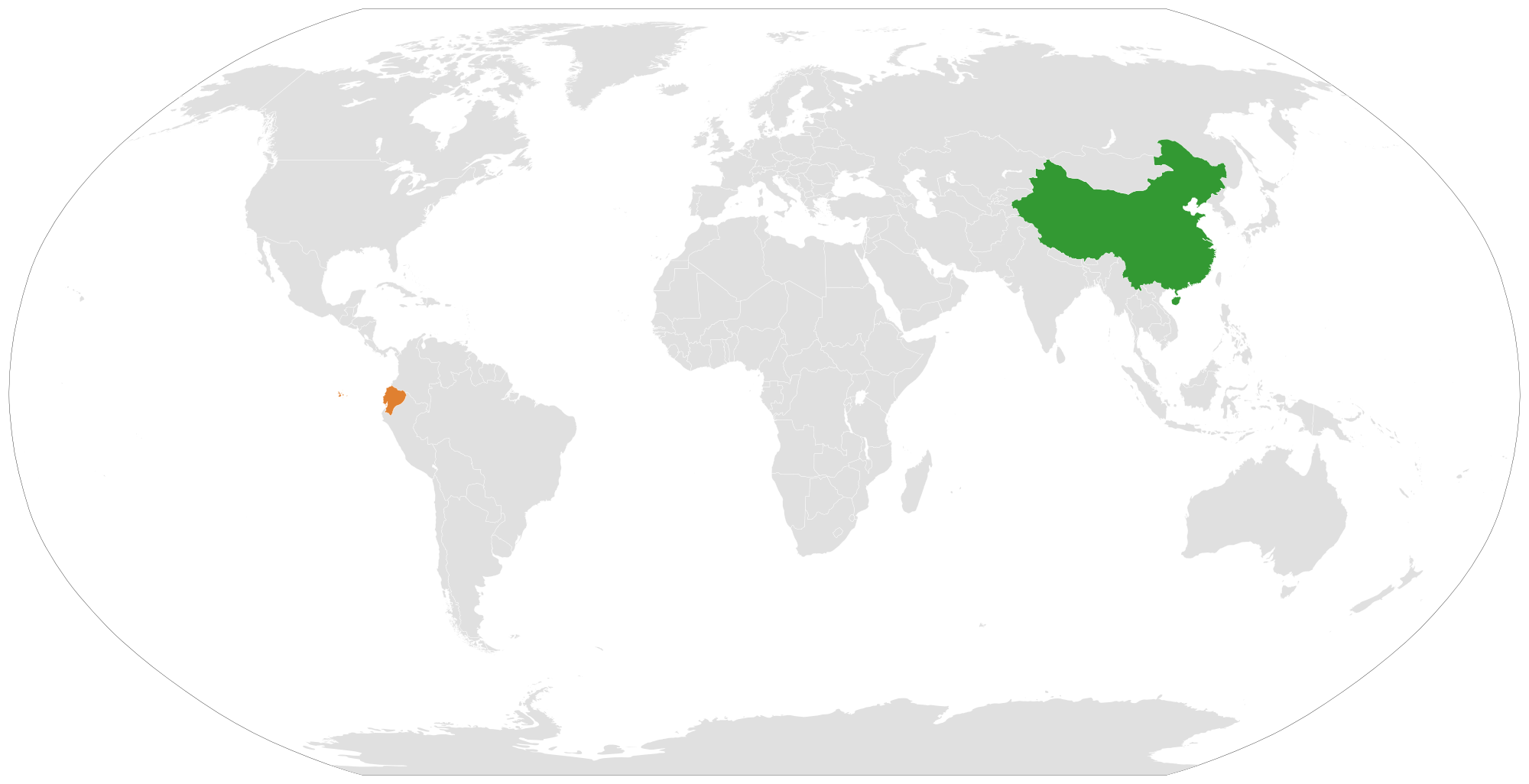
- China: Ecuador

Although China's economic influence is growing rapidly throughout Latin America, it is perhaps most evident in Ecuador where it enjoys a near-monopoly of crude oil exports. Critics of Ecuadorian President Rafael Correa say that the Chinese influence has gone too far and threatens national sovereignty while indigenous peoples' rights and biodiversity could be severely harmed because of Ecuador's oil commitments to China.

== Historical relationship ==
=== 19th century immigration ===
Like many other Latin American nations, early contact between Ecuador and China consisted of the flow of Chinese migrants into the nation during the late nineteenth century. Many of these migrants, who were primarily from the Guangdong province, were fleeing the political and economic strife which had destabilized China during that time. Although these individuals had originally set out to resettle in Peru, Chinese communities began to emerge in the Guayas Province of Ecuador around 1880. These immigrants often worked agricultural, fishing, or mining jobs, while some did start restaurants and businesses, and eventually assimilated into Ecuadorian culture. This process was helped by Ecuadorian social organizations such as the China Beneficence, which effectively aided Chinese immigrants in finding employment and supplied social support. Remnants of these organizations still exist for the purpose of both aiding Chinese Ecuadorians and forging business connections between Ecuadorian professionals and their Chinese counterparts. Today, the Chinese-Ecuadorian community is rather small due to the successful assimilation measures taken by the Ecuadorian government, and is made up of about 2,500 people. Notable Ecuadorians of Chinese descent include Li Jian (footballer, born 1989) and businessman Carlos Moncayo.

=== 20th century ===
While official diplomatic relations between Ecuador and the People's Republic of China were not opened until 1980, Ecuadorian leaders had been demonstrating interest in China since the late 1960s. During this time, the Ecuadorian government abstained from voting on a resolution which blocked the PRC from holding a seat on the United Nations. In the early 1970s, during the presidency of José María Velasco Ibarra, China and Ecuador began to build a commercial relationship, with each nation establishing an office of commerce in the other country. This early progress was interrupted by a series of military coups which destabilized Ecuador from 1972 to 1979. The resulting military governments were unsympathetic to the Chinese regime, thus causing the lack of notable development of Sino-Ecuadorian relations during this period. Following the election of Jaime Roldós Aguilera in 1979 and the re-establishment of civilian rule in Ecuador, official diplomatic relations were established in 1980. Once relations were established, several Ecuadorian heads of state visited China in the late 20th century. The first trip was made by president Oswaldo Hurtado in 1984, followed by a 10-year hiatus, which was broken by president Sixto Durán Ballén in 1994, and then again by Jamil Mahuad in 1999.

=== 21st century ===
While many Ecuadorian executives visited China, no Chinese leader reciprocated until CCP general secretary Xi Jinping visited Ecuador in 2016.

Ecuador joined the Belt and Road Initiative (BRI) in 2018.

In 2024, Ecuador reinstated a visa requirement for Chinese visitors due to an increase in irregular migratory flows.

== Lending ==
China's oil consumption doubled between 2000 and 2010, and is likely to surpass the United States by 2019. China has been searching outside its national borders to find a solution for its rising energy needs; currently more than half of its oil consumption comes from imports. China already controls growing volumes of oil from Venezuela, where it has negotiated at least $43 billion in loans; from Russia, where the amount may exceed $55 billion; and Brazil, with at least $10 billion. In Angola, the deals total around $13 billion.

Shortly after taking office in 2007, President Rafael Correa declared a large chunk of Ecuador's $3.2 billion in foreign debt "illegitimate" and "odious," and the country defaulted the next year. With Ecuador considered a pariah in credit markets and struggling to keep its economy solvent, PetroChina, the Chinese oil and gas company and the listed arm of state-owned China National Petroleum Corporation (CNPC), offered a lifeline in July 2009, lending $1 billion to the Correa administration. The "pre-finance" deal was to be repaid over 2 years and carried a 7.25 percent interest rate. Part of the loan agreement stipulated that PetroEcuador, Ecuador's state oil company, sell Amazonian crude to PetroChina. Ecuador committed 96,000 barrels per day to Chinese firms.

Since 2008 Ecuador has borrowed over $11 billion from China, many used for infrastructure, oil, mining and energy projects. In 2010, the China Export-Import Bank provided a loan of $1.7 billion to the Ecuadorian government for the Coca-Codo Sinclair hydroelectric dam and $570 million for the Sopladora hydroelectric dam, and the Chinese Development Bank loaned PetroEcuador $1 billion. In 2011, PetroChina paid a $1 billion down payment on oil to PetroEcuador. The Chinese Development Bank gave an additional $2 billion loan to the Ecuadorian government, 70% of which was designated for the Ecuadorian government's discretion and 30% of which was for oil. Many of the loans that have followed have been in the $1–2 billion range, with interest rates of between 6% and 8%, and demand payment in barrels of crude oil through 2024.

In 2013, Chinese money helped cover as much as 61% of the government's financing needs. In exchange, China has claimed nearly 90% of the country's oil shipments over the next few years, most of which it then trades around the world and especially in the United States A new credit line is under negotiation since mid 2014, which would be in addition to $9 billion in financing that Ecuador is seeking from China for the construction of a refinery that will process 200,000 barrels of crude oil a day, as well as a $2 billion loan signed with state oil company Sinopec. Including the credit line, these loans from China are equivalent to about 13.6% of Ecuador's GDP as of 2013. The consequent risk is that Ecuador loses it sovereignty, and when it is forced to drill for oil in its natural and ethnic reserves to repay its debts to China, indigenous peoples' rights are violated and some of the most biodiverse areas in the world are harmed. Critics of the current administration say Ecuador will resemble a wholly owned subsidiary of China, much like many solvency-challenged yet resource-rich countries in sub-Saharan Africa.

President Correa has publicly complained about China's guarantee demands of the loans, calling it "attempts against the sovereignty of Ecuador". During these public denouncements however, Correa's administration was secretly signing a letter allowing PetroChina to seize assets from any oil companies operating in Ecuador in the event that Ecuador would not pay back its loans to China in full.

Even more worrying is the "Four Party Agreement" from August 2010, signed by PetroEcuador, the Ecuadorian Ministry of Finance, PetroChina and the Chinese Development Bank. Article 15 of that contract has what Analytica Investments calls a "sovereignty immunity waiver" that allows China to seize many of Ecuador's assets if the country fails to repay the loans and requires Ecuador "to irrevocably and unconditionally [waive] any right... to assert any immunity from or in any proceedings... against it or its assets." The clause excludes Ecuador's military equipment, embassies, consulates, natural resources that have not yet been extracted, its archives and cultural heritage, and any property that China would be unable to seize under Ecuadorian law. However, it is unclear what, if any, assets Ecuadorian law would exclude. The Account Management Agreement that PetroEcuador and the Chinese Development Bank signed on the same day has an identical clause.

== Amazonian oil ==
China has also tried to secure its loans by pushing for a massive expansion of Ecuador's oil frontier, especially in the central-south Amazon and Yasuní National Park, before and after the Yasuní-ITT Initiative failed. The Yasuní-ITT Initiative was the proposal by the government of Ecuador to refrain indefinitely from exploiting the oil reserves of the Ishpingo-Tambococha-Tiputini (ITT) oil field in the Yasuní National Park, in exchange for half of the value of the reserves, or $3.6 billion over 13 years from the international community. The aim of the initiative was to conserve biodiversity, protect indigenous peoples living in voluntary isolation, and avoid the release of CO_{2} emissions. The Yasuni-ITT Trust Fund was officially launched on 3 August 2010, but in July 2013 it was concluded that economic results were insufficient. President Correa disbanded the plan on August 15, 2013.

Chinese companies Sipec and Andes Petroleum, which merged with Chinese conglomerate PetroOriental, were already operating in the northern Ecuadorian Amazon and Yasuní National Park. Shortly after the Yasuní-ITT Initiative failed, Andes submitted bids on blocks 79 and 83 within the Yasuní National Park. These blocks are home of the Sápara, of whom there are an estimated 200 left in Ecuador and who UNESCO recognised as a cultural patrimony. Block 79 is also home to the Kichwa and Block 83 to the Kichwa and Shiwiar in addition to the Sápara.

In addition, the Yasuní National Park, including the ITT blocks, is globally outstanding for its exceptional biological richness across taxonomic groups (amphibians, birds, mammals, plants, insects and fish). Of these, a considerable number is globally threatened, i.e., listed by the IUCN as Critically Endangered, Endangered, or Vulnerable. These include 13 documented vertebrate species and an estimated 56 plant species; an additional 15 vertebrate species are Near Threatened. Further oil development in Yasuní jeopardises these species that are already threatened on a global scale, as well as the park's remarkable species richness and its conservation values. Several scientific studies have been conducted that demonstrate any new oil activities and road construction in Yasuní should be stopped immediately.

Yet according to media reports in the US and UK, in 2009, long before the Yasuní-ITT Initiative failed, Ecuador's ministry of economic policy gave a private presentation to President Correa's staff in which the ministry promised to "make the utmost effort to support PetroChina and Andes Petroleum in the exploration of the ITT", disregarding consequences for indigenous peoples inhabiting this part of the park and impacts on biodiversity. These claims are rejected by Ecuador, which claims that the documents upon which they were based, provided by an opposition politician in Ecuador, were doctored. Ten days after Ecuador's decision to abandon the Yasuní-ITT Initiative the government announced that it had received another $1.2 billion loan from China.

== Security ==
In 2012, China loaned Ecuador 240 million dollars for the purpose of overhauling the Ecuadorian security system. This system comprises 4,300 new surveillance cameras, drones, automated evidence processing systems, and increased manpower to manage each of these new technologies, which have been collectively dubbed the ECU 911 Integrated Security Service. Much of this new hardware has been developed in Ecuador, but in laboratories designed and set up by China National Electronics Import and Export Corporation (CEIEC), which is a state-owned company and a subsidiary of national defence contractor China Electronics Corporation (CEC). The CEC has also undertaken similar surveillance overhauls in Venezuela and Bolivia, and has also introduced technology to monitor the Amazon Rainforest in Brazil. The Ecuadorian government has highlighted the benefits of this extensive security system, which has been installed across the nation's 24 provinces. They argue that it has been able to decrease the response time for everyday emergencies such as life-threatening illness, and have cited the system as a large factor in the dramatic drop in crime in Ecuador since its installation. Some individuals have expressed concern about the nature and the pervasiveness of these technologies, however, and how they may be used to create an Ecuadorian police state. Many members of the international community have been closely observing the usage of similar systems in China, and have found that the facial recognition systems can locate a person of interest in around 7 minutes. The recent employment of dubious surveillance and manipulation tactics by the Ecuadorian government may validate these concerns, with some scholars going so far as to warn that similar systems can encourage authoritarian practices.

== Resident diplomatic missions ==
of China in Ecuador

- Quito (Embassy)
- Guayaquil (Consulate-General)

of Ecuador in China

- Beijing (Embassy)
- Guangzhou (Consulate-General)
- Shanghai (Consulate-General)

== See also ==
- China-Latin America relations
