= Sapara people =

Sapara people may refer to:

- Sápara, an indigenous people of Ecuador and Peru
- Sapará, an indigenous people of Brazil
