= Alicia Cawiya =

Ecuadorian Huaorani activist

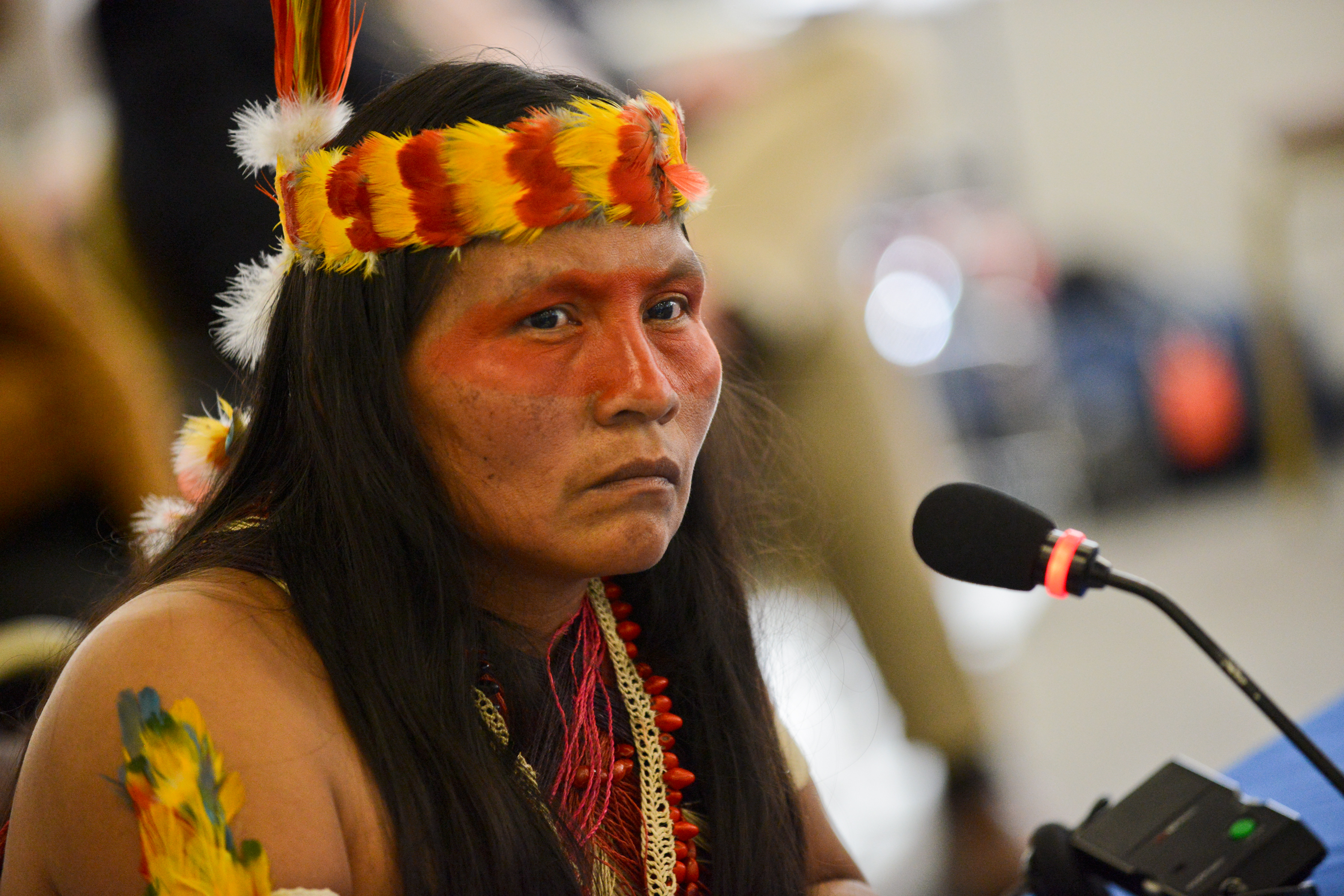
- Cawiya in 2015
- Born: Ñoneno community, Yasuní, Ecuador
- Organization(s): National Waorani Federation (NAWE), Ecuador Waorani Women Association

Alicia Cawiya or Cahuiya is the vice-president of the Huaorani Nation of Ecuador and one of the leaders of the movement against oil exploitation in her region. In 2013, she made a speech in Ecuador's parliament to protect the Amazon basin from oil companies.

== Life ==
=== Childhood ===
Cawiya was born in the Ñoneno community in the Yasuní reservation in Ecuador. Her grandmother, Iteca, was known to be a feared Huaorani warrior.

When Cawiya was a child, she was sent to be raised by missionaries, who had the task of "civilising the barbarians" so the oil companies could move in to indigenous territory without resistance, although Iteca brought her back to the forest.

=== Political life ===
In an interview with New Internationalist, Cawiya said that she became politically active at the age of 13. At 18 she was a leader, following the footsteps of her grandmother in a traditionally male-dominated community.

Women at the time were not allowed to make decisions. But my grandmother said that as men and women were engaged in the same struggle to keep their territory [from incursions by oil companies], why could they not do it together?

— Alicia Cawiya, Newint.org

She became vice-president of the National Waorani Federation (NAWE) and in 2005 she and other communities leaders founded the Asociación de Mujeres Waorani del Ecuador (Ecuador Waorani Women Association), which now comprises around 300 women. The aim of the association is to protect the organic lifestyle of their people and to fight against oil companies.

In 2013, she made headlines when she defended her people and made a speech in Ecuador's parliament asking to stop the Yasuní-ITT plan and the incursion of oil companies in the Amazon.

== Oil companies conflict in Ecuador ==
Since 1972, Ecuador has been an important oil exporter in South America - the third after Venezuela and Mexico. The infrastructure put in place to extract the oil affected the Ecuadorian Amazon region both socially and ecologically.

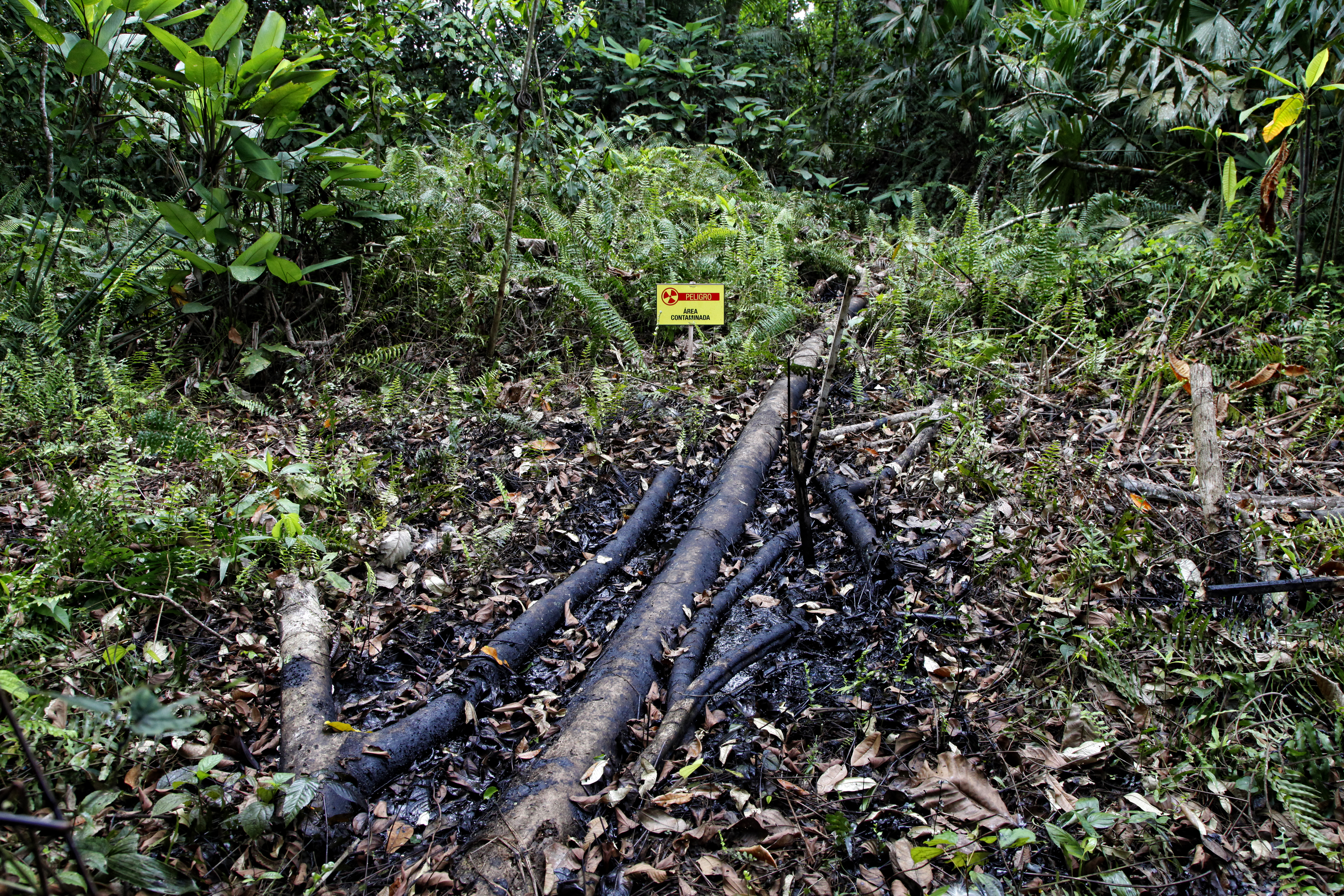
Campaign "The dirty hand of Chevron"

One of the most known examples is the Texaco-Chevron case. This American oil company operated in the Ecuadorian Amazon region between 1964 and 1992. During this period, Texaco drilled 339 wells in 15 petroleum fields and abandoned 627 toxic wastewater pits, as well as other elements of the oil infrastructure. It is now known that these highly polluting and now obsolete technologies were used as a way to reduce expenses.

After the company left the country, the government initiated legal actions to obtain compensation, as the company had tried to avoid paying a fee of 19 million dollars. This conflict lasted for more than twenty years until in June 2017, the United States Supreme Court ruled in favor of the Texaco-Chevron. Ecuadorian activists have said that they will continue to try to bring these companies to justice.

In September 2013, the Ecuadorian government announced the exploitation of the Yasuní area and the 43 block, better known as ITT (Ishpingo, Tiputini and Tambococha), which was supposed to have a big economical impact.

== Cawiya's speech ==
On 3 October 2013, the Constituent Assembly in Quito gathered to discuss the Yasuní-ITT plan. Cawiya was invited to participate as vice-president of the Huaorani Nation of Ecuador, and she was expected to read the script given to her by her president, Chief Moi Enomenga. The speech acceded to oil drilling in her homeland in the headwaters of the Amazon River.

When Cawiya stood up to talk, she defied her president and the government and made her own speech, first in her native Huaorani language, then in Spanish, denouncing the oil companies and speaking up in defence of her people.

Seven companies have been working in Huaorani territory and we have become poorer... How have we benefited? Not at all.

— Alicia Cawiya, Newit.org

She talked about the negative impact of oil drilling in the Amazon and accused many of being complicit in deforestation and the subsequent death of some indigenous people.

Cawiya's speech wasn't enough to change the decision of the Constituent Assembly however, and the Yasuní-TT exploitation was accepted by 108 to 133 votes. The construction of the infrastructures started in 2016.

=== Consequences ===
After her speech, Cawiya received death threats."Hueiya Alicia Cahuiya Iteca". 31 May 2019., although this did not impede her activism. She continues to advocate for her community as leader of the AMWAE.

== Awards ==
In November 2023, Cawiya was named to the BBC's 100 Women list.
