= Anita Rivas =

Ecuadorian politician (born 1972)

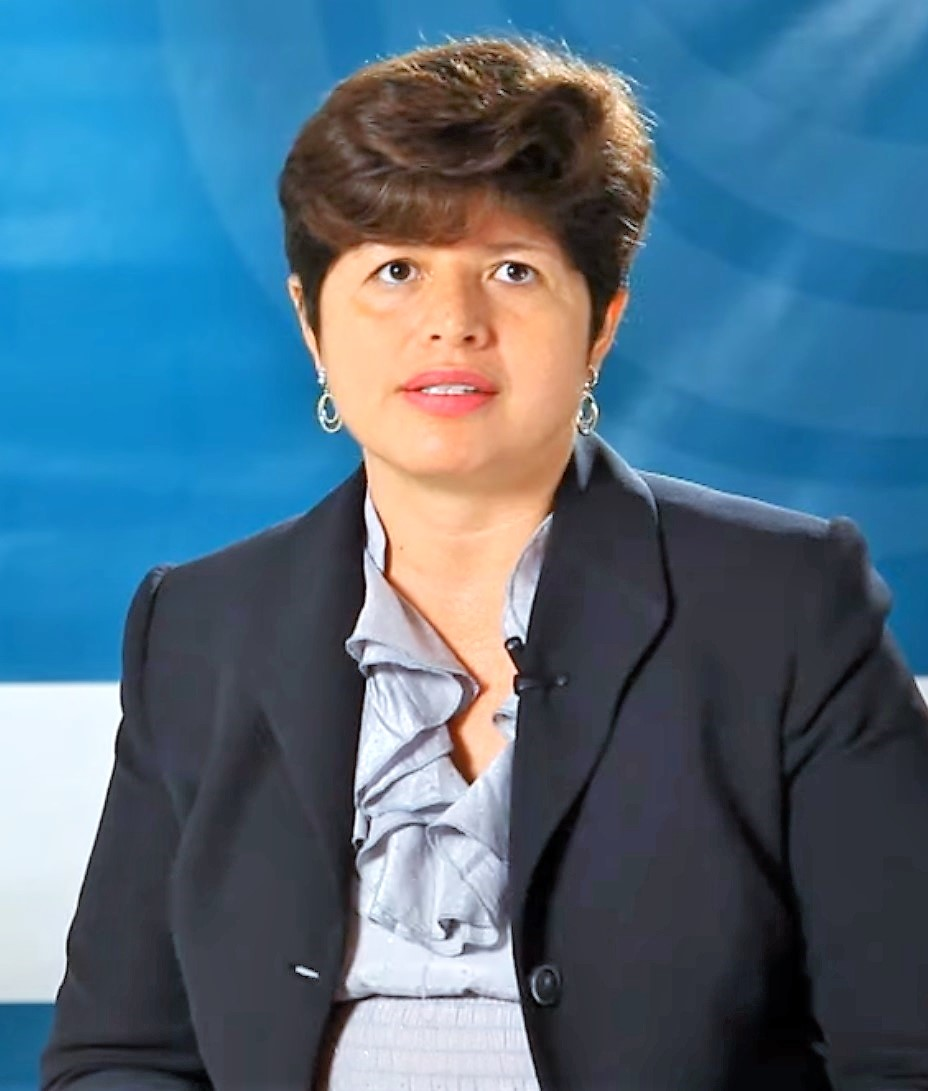
- Rivas speaks to Grupo FARO Ecuador in 2012

Mayor of Puerto Francisco de Orellana
- In office 5 January 2005–18 December 2018
- Preceded by: Guadalupe Llori
- Succeeded by: Antonio Cabrera Vera

Personal details
- Born: May 4, 1972 Puerto Francisco de Orellana, Orellana, Ecuador
- Party: Orellana People's Movement (local; since 2014)
- Other political affiliations: Pachakutik Plurinational Unity Movement – New Country (until 2014); PAIS Alliance (national; 2014 to 2018)
- Education: Universidad Técnica Particular de Loja
- Occupation: Lawyer

Anita Carolina Rivas Párraga (born May 4, 1972) is an Ecuadorian lawyer and politician. She was the mayor of Puerto Francisco de Orellana from 2005 to 2019. In 2009 she visited the United Kingdom, Luxembourg and Spain to propose that oil in her area could remain unexploited if compensation could be found and Yasuni National Park's habitat would be preserved. The eventual support delivered was less than 0.5 per cent of the money requested. The oil revenue that was delivered was spent on items including the supply of toilets and drinking water.

== Life ==
Rivas was born in Puerto Francisco de Orellana in 1972, three years after her parents, Dioselinda Párraga and Enrique Rivas, moved from Manabí. Her secondary education was in Quito at the Colegio Padre Miguel Gamboa (Coca) and the Colegio Los Pinos. She went to gain her degrees in law and in Social Sciences and Economic Policies at the Universidad Técnica Particular de Loja.

In 1991 she joined her city's administration working in the police station, leading the library and directing their human resources. In 2000 she was elected a councillor and she served for four years with two of them as Deputy Mayor.

Yasuni National Park

In 2005 she was elected to be the Mayor of Francisco de Orellana and in 2007 she and the prefect were accused of causing riots. Guadalupe Llori was arrested and they were both blamed but Rivas said they had only been trying to mediate the situation in Dayuma which she blamed on the President Rafael Correa. In 2008 she visited the United Kingdom for five days with a proposal to stop oil production and to leave the oil unexploited to make a contribution towards climate change. After meetings she flew to Luxembourg and on to Spain. She proposed that the Yasuni rainforest could be preserved if money could be found to compensate people for the loss of oil revenues. Rivas pleaded with Western consumers that their use of oil was destroying her land. She said oil production "has brought deforestation, displacement, pollution and diseases to the province, which despite this is the second poorest in the country". In 2012 she was working with the think tank Grupo FARO as she tried to negotiate concerning extractive industries in her area. The proposal was abandoned in 2013 after the president found that, despite all of the international support, less than 0.5 per cent of the funds required to mitigate lost revenue had arrived in Ecuador.

Rivas was re-elected in 2009 having changed her political allegiance in 2014. In 2014 she stood for the PAIS Alliance and was re-elected for a third term, having promised to spend oil revenues on toilets and drinking water.

Rivas has been helping organise support for the indigenous people who are obtaining grants of land that will enable them to preserve their way of life. She stood down in 2019, and Antonio Cabrera became the new mayor.
