= Ecuador Mi Pais =

Ecuador Mi País (EMiP) is a non-governmental organization (NGO) founded in August 2005 as an initiative of Ecuadorian professionals living in the Washington D.C. area, United States, that felt a desire to contribute to the social and economic development of their country. Its founders felt the most effective way to collaborate towards the development of the country was by supporting educational projects targeted to low-income groups. Since its origin, the organization has sponsored more than 100 students.

EMiP is a registered 501(c)(3) organization operated and directed by volunteers. It was legally incorporated in the District of Columbia (D.C.) in June 2006.

EMiP was conceived to promote equal opportunities and to facilitate access to education for underprivileged children and adolescents in Ecuador, regardless of gender and ethnicity. The organization has affiliates in states of the United States of America, and also in Spain, Italy, France, and the United Kingdom, countries that have concentrations of Ecuadorian immigrants.

== Organization ==
Location of Ecuador in South America

Its members also organize fund-raising events to celebrate national festivities and promote Ecuadorian culture.

EMiP costs are less than 10% of revenues. The majority of Ecuadorians that volunteer for the organization reside in the United States of America.

The organization has partnered with Ecuadorian and international organizations in Washington D.C. such as the Ecuadorian Embassy in Washington D.C., Grupo FARO, Symphony for Life -Ecuador, the Association of Ecuadorian Ladies in Washington D.C. (ADEW Ecuador), Federación de Entidades Ecuatorianas en el Exterior (FEDEE), Young2Young Community of the World Bank, Young Connection of the Inter-American Development Bank, and Centro Argentino (CEGA). These partnerships are sought to develop new ways to contribute to development projects and to work with the D.C. metro area community. One of EMiP's projects was selected as a finalist at the 2008 World Bank Remittances Fair, held in Bolivia.

== Projects and programs ==
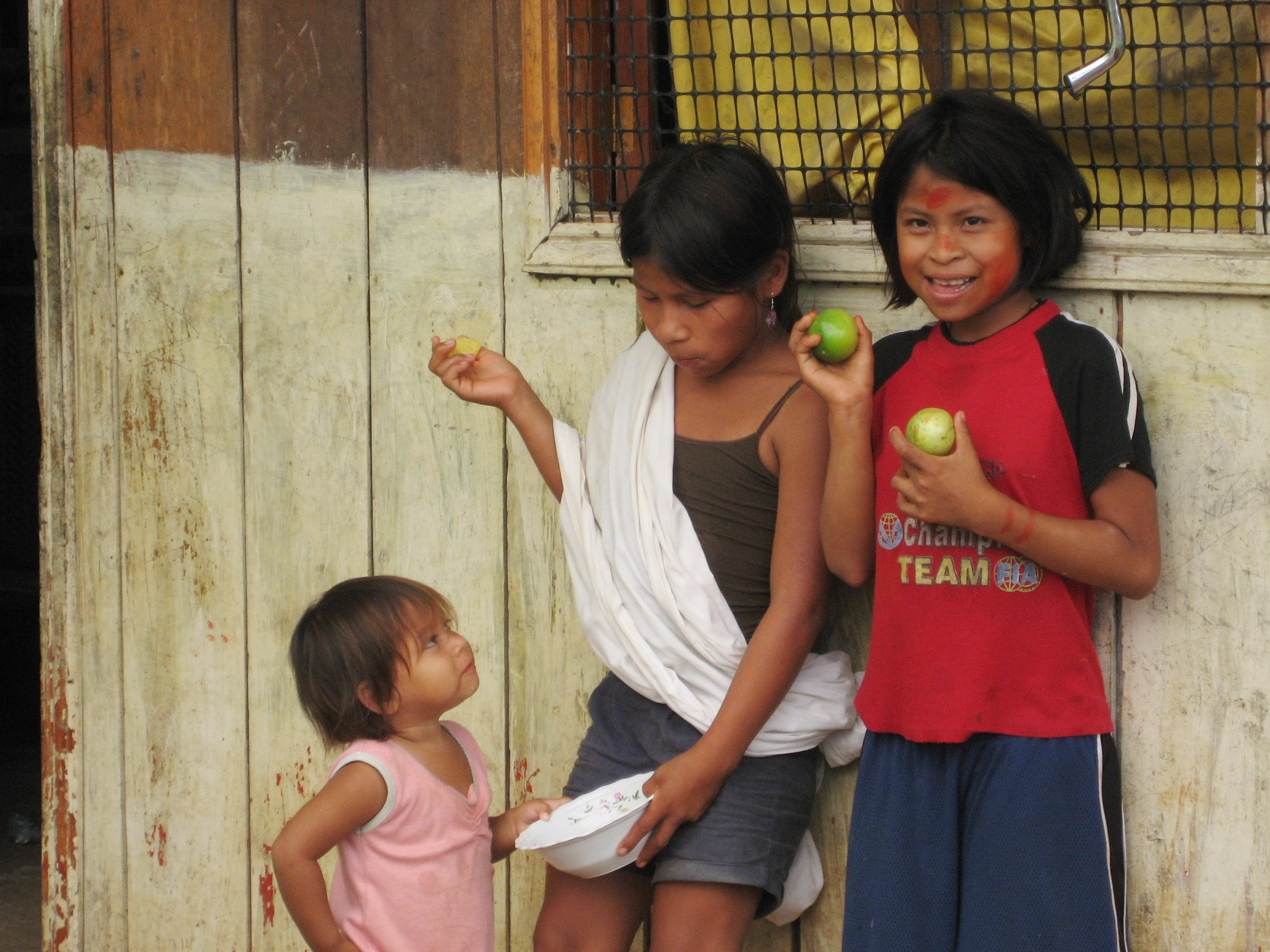
Ecuadorian Children

The organization's main project is Edusemillas (Education Seeds), a sponsorship program established in 2007. The project was created to provide education scholarships to students in poor economic circumstances. EMiP has been teaming up with organizations in Ecuador to help locate schools and educational programs that are able to work with the organization. During the 2007–2008 school year, Edusemillas sponsored 91 basic education students, and three university students. The funds collected are used only for educational purposes, and the program is run by volunteers, which ensures that the money of the sponsor goes to the children, rather than administrative expenses.

== Services offered ==
With a monthly contribution of $25, sponsors cover the educational expenses of one student in a given year. EMiP ensures that the child or adolescent attends classes, while at the same time committing the student's parents or guardians to support and encourage their children's education. Each individual sponsorship covers school supplies, uniforms, tuition, and a monthly stipend for attendance at an elementary or high school.

== Monitoring and evaluation ==
EMiP prepares information reports of each sponsored student, which includes a final report card and a summary of how the contributions were used. This information is sent twice per year to each sponsor. The partners associated with the program provide EMiP with quarterly report cards obtained from each student.

Scholarship recipients are required to maintain a minimum grade average of 16/20 in a school year to keep their scholarship. Few scholarships have been cancelled due to failure of obtaining the required grade average, and the majority of children take advantage of the economic support for several years. EMiP is sponsoring the college education of three students that are currently attending local public universities.

In order to ensure that the funds provided for educational purposes are used only for this purpose, EMiP signs a contract with each one of the program's partners specifying what type of expenses are allowed. Each partner provides detail annual expense summaries, including invoices to back up these expenses.

== Target population ==
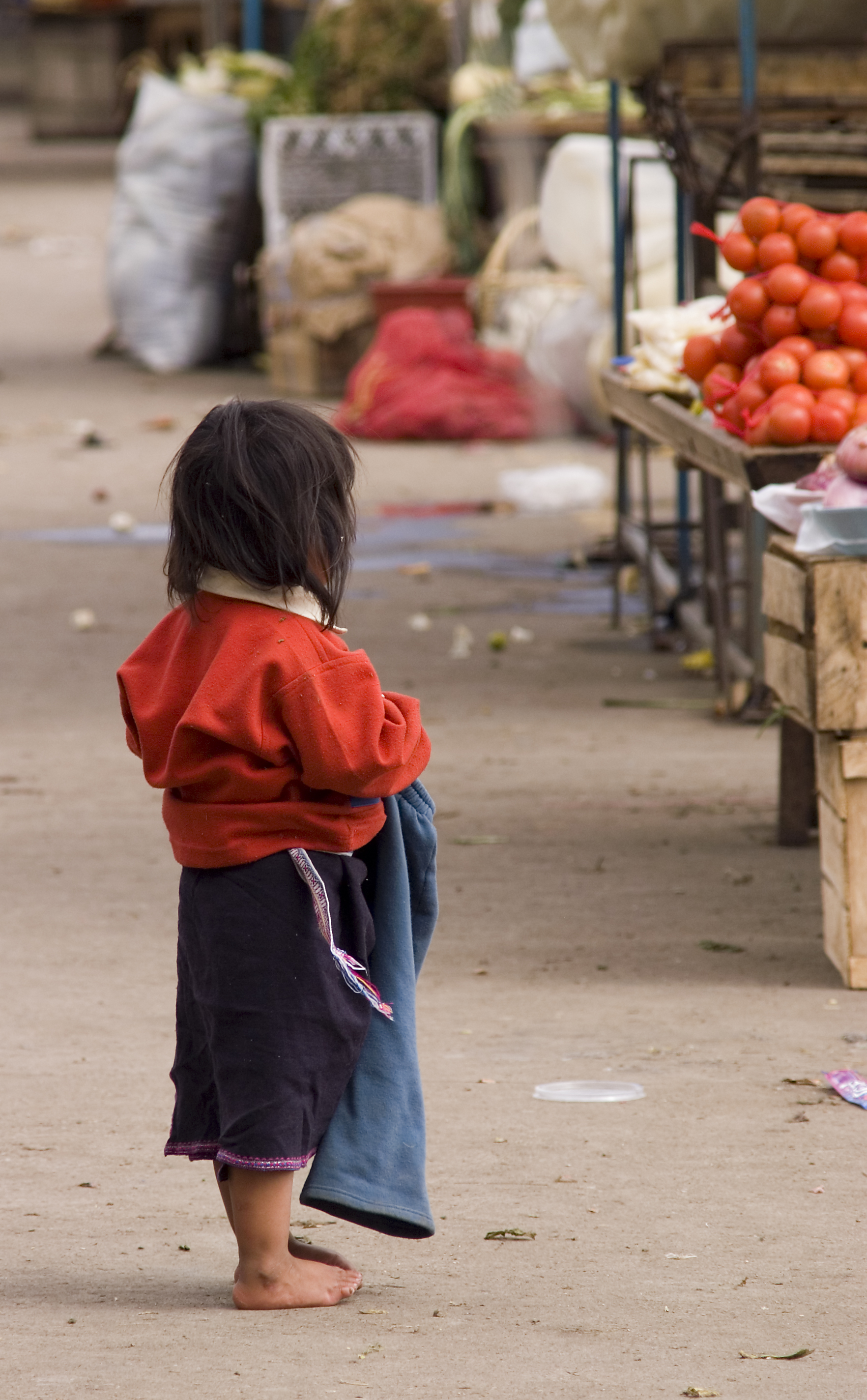
Rural Ecuadorian child

The services provided are not limited to specific religious or ethnic groups. However, in the distribution of the scholarships, EMiP tries to maintain gender parity.

== Partners ==
The organization is working with the following partners:

- Casa Victoria Foundation in the city of Quito, province of Pichincha. It is sponsoring 20 children.
- Muchacho Trabajador Program - a program to eliminate child labor and maintain children in school - in the city of Manta, province of Manabí and the city of Esmeraldas, province of Esmeraldas
- Fé y Alegría School in the city of Cuenca, province of Azuay
- Embassy of Ecuador in Washington D.C.
- Grupo FARO, a public policy advocacy NGO
- Symphony for Life - Ecuador
- Asociación de Damas Ecuatorianas en Washington (ADEW)
- Federación de Entidades Ecuatorianas en el Exterior (FEDEE)
- World Bank Young2Young Community
- Inter-American Development Bank Young Connection:
- Centro Argentino
