= Grupo FARO =

Ecuadorian nonprofit think tank

Grupo FARO (Foundation for the Advance of Reforms and Opportunities), is an independent, nonprofit and secular think tank. Grupo FARO was founded in Ecuador in 2004.

== History ==
It was established to provide support active participation of civil society, the business sector and state entities, based on research and analysis, for aiming to consolidate an Ecuadorian State that is more efficient and equitable.

in 2009, Grupo FARO was awarded a grant by the Think Tank Initiative -a global programme funded by IDRC, The William and Flora Hewlett Foundation, The Bill and Melinda Gates Foundation, DFID and DGIS.

Its co-funder and current executive director is Orazio Bellettini.

In 2012 it was working with Anita Rivas as she tried to handle the impact of extractive industry in her area. A proposal to stop oil drilling in exchange for money was abandoned in 2013 after the president found that, despite all of the offers of international support, less than 0.5 per cent of the funds required to mitigate lost revenue had arrived in Ecuador.

== Strategic approaches ==
1. Information-based dialogue: Grupo FARO will promote dialogue based on information, through the presentation of evidences for a strict analysis and plural spaces to find solutions on public issues.
2. Development of capacities: Grupo FARO will focus its efforts on developing capacities in actors for transformation of ideas into actions, through training, organization improvement and generation of public-private alliances.
3. Promotion of transparency in the impact of individual and collective actions: Grupo FARO will implement systems to improve transparency and evaluate the impact of public policies and actions, both of public and private actors.

== Intervention areas ==
1. Environment and society
2. Public governance
3. Equity and social opportunities
4. Information society
5. Economic growth

== Associations and partnerships ==
Grupo FARO has established a number of national, regional and global partnerships including with: The Overseas Development Institute, the Centro de Políticas Comparadas de Educación (CPCE) at Diego Portales University in Chile, and Ecuador Mi Pais.

== See also ==
- Think tanks
