= Sápara =

Indigenous people native to the Amazon rainforest

Zápara
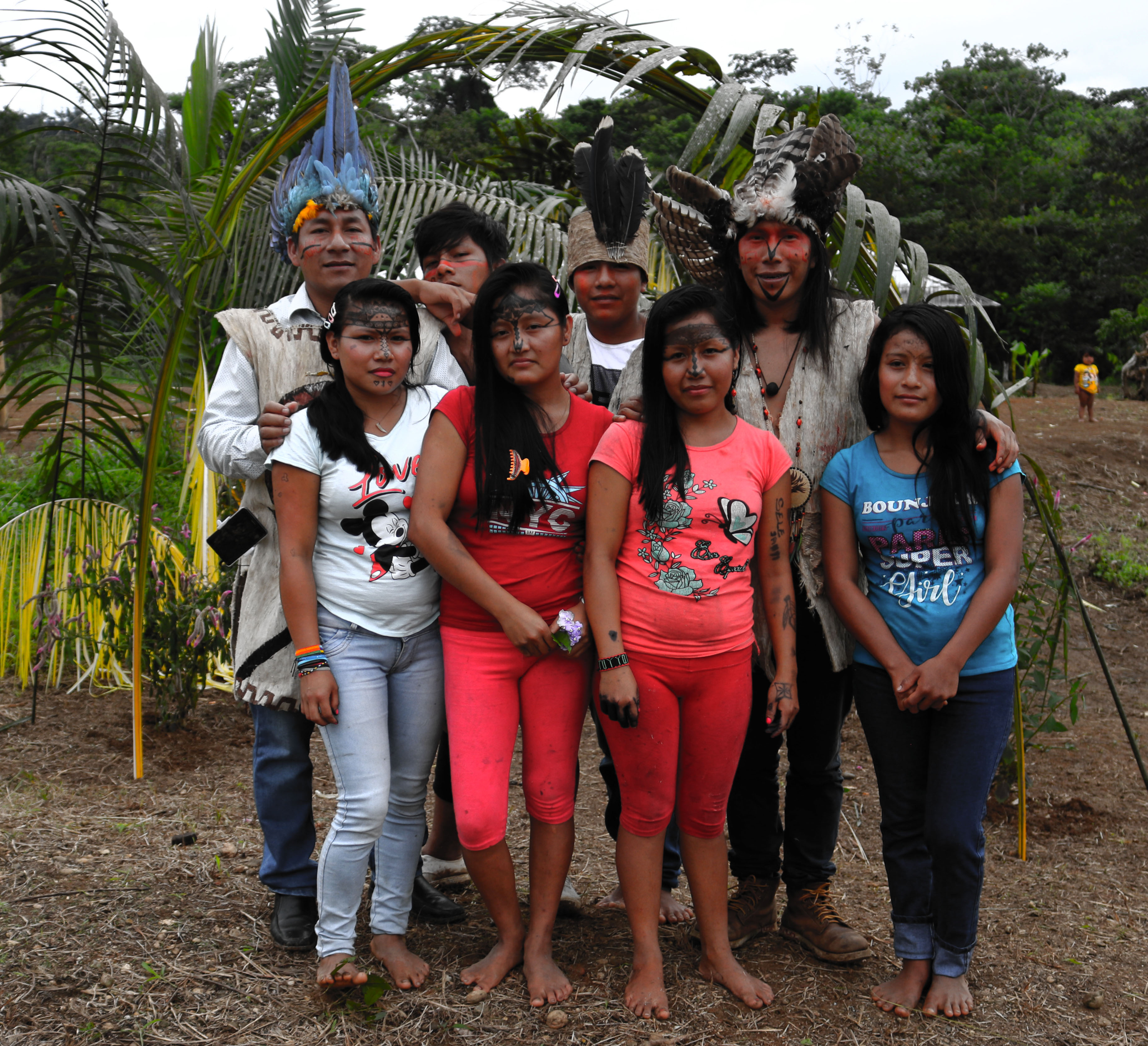
- Picture of people in Bartolo Ushigua.

Total population
- approx. 350

Regions with significant populations
- Ecuador: 250
- Peru: 100

Languages
- Quechua, Spanish, Záparo

The Sápara, also known as Zápara or Záparo, are an indigenous people native to the Amazon rainforest along the border of Ecuador and Peru. They once occupied some 12,000 mi^{2} between the Napo River and the Pastaza. Early in the 20th century, there were some 200,000 Zapara. From the year 2009 on the Ecuadorian Zápara call themselves Sápara. The official name is Nación Sápara del Ecuador (NASE). It means Sápara Nation of Ecuador. The president of this nation is Klever Ruiz. The Sápara Nation was officially registered by CONDENPE – the Council of Development of the nationalities and peoples of Ecuador – on September 16, 2009. The current name of the organisation is the result of a unification process of upriver and downriver communities. There was a conflict between these different groups about their authentic ethnic identity in the last years of the 20th century and the beginning of the 21st century. With this unification this conflict seems to be solved. CONDENPE confirms as well officially the legal status of autonomy or self-government of the Sápara Nation of Ecuador N.A.S.E. and confirms their territory between the rivers Pindoyacu, Conambo and Alto Corrientes (Upper River) in the province of Pastaza. It is confirmed as well that the head office of NASE is the city of Shell, Pastaza.

The name Sápara is also a result of the fact that the alphabetic character Z does not exist in the alphabet of the Sáparas. This is information of Bartolo Ushigua Santi from December 10, 2009. He wrote that this fact is a result of investigations about the grammar of the Sápara language made by the Sápara Board of Education Bilingual – Dirección de Educación Bilingüe Sápara (DIENASE). They found out that the alphabet of the Sáparas ended with the character W.

== Culture ==
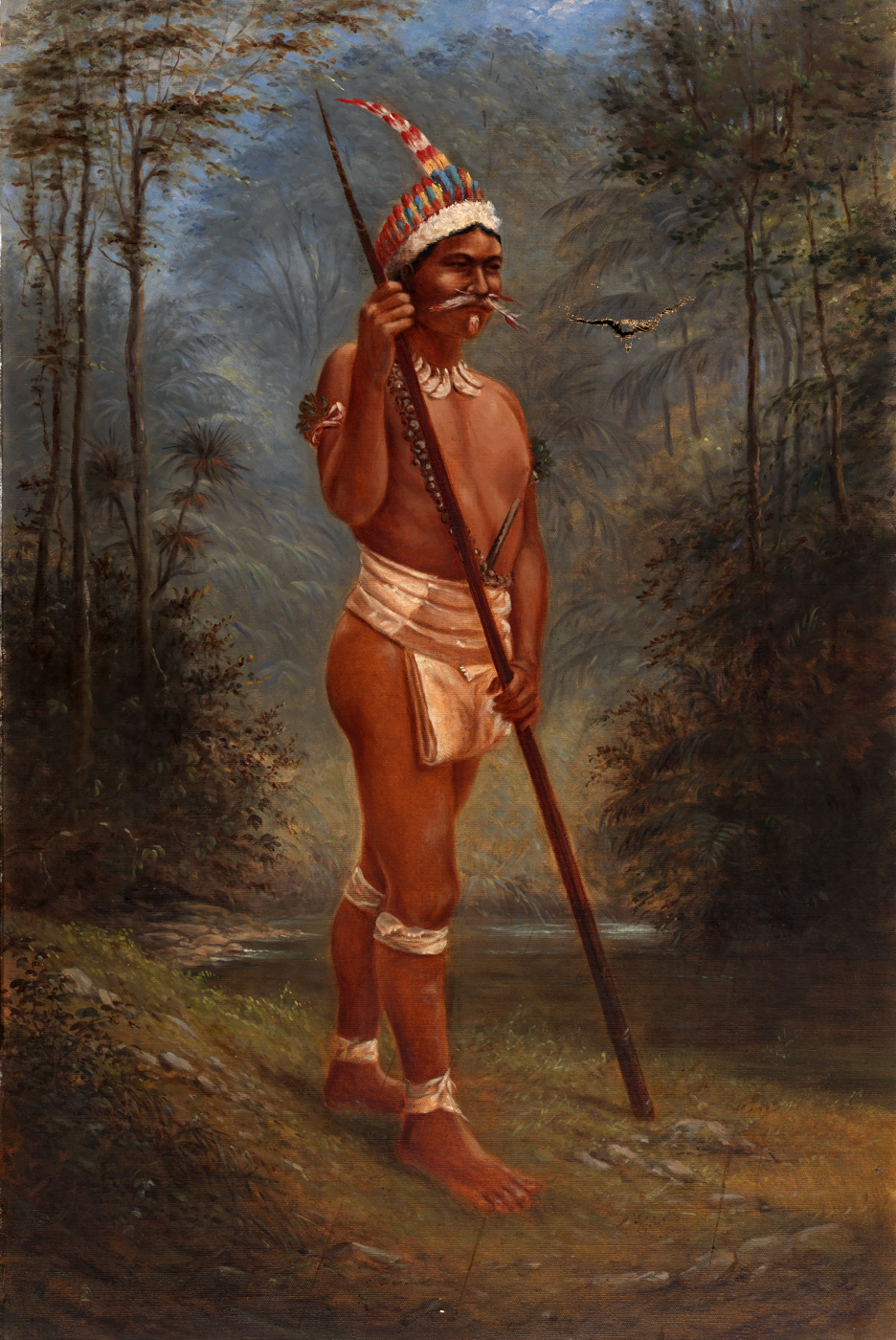
Painting of Sápara man, c. 1893

They ate palm hearts as their main vegetable and they fished the many rivers of their jungle home. Using blowguns and bamboo darts, they hunted tapirs, peccaries, wood-quail, and curassows. They did not hunt spider monkeys because they believed them to be their ancestors. The 20th century demand for rubber led to the destruction of much of their jungle (and the animals who lived in it) and the enslavement of the people. The men were forced as slaves to cultivate rubber. The women and girls were raped and forced into sexual slavery.

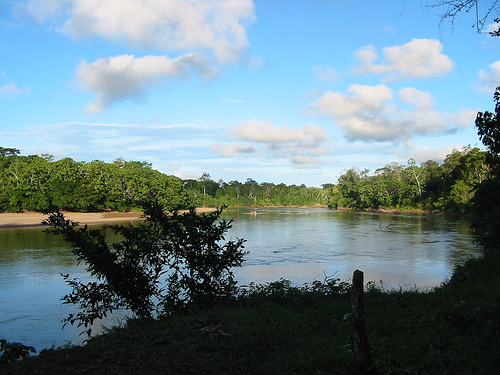
The rio Curaray

== Language ==
Their numbers dwindled precipitously to the point where there are only a few who speak their native language. The oldest surviving Zaparo-speaker is a man, about 80 years old, Pedro Ernesto Santi. He and his family live in a hamlet on the river, home to some forty people.

Today, only four Sápara people, all aged over 70, still speak the Záparo language with some degree of fluency.

The UNESCO declared the Záparo language as an "Oral and Intangible Heritage of Humanity" in 2001.

== Threats to Sápara territory ==
Ever since China started lending large sums of money to Ecuador in exchange for crude oil (see China-Ecuador relations), China has pushed for a massive expansion of Ecuador’s oil frontier. This concerns the central-south Amazon and Yasuní National Park in particular. Chinese companies Sipec and Andes Petroleum, which merged with Chinese conglomerate PetroOriental, submitted bids on blocks 79 and 83 within the Yasuní National Park. The Sápara's territory falls entirely within these oil blocks. Block 79 is also home to the Kichwa and Block 83 to the Kichwa and Shiwiar in addition to the Sápara. Opening up this sensitive region to oil development would likely result in cultural genocide and the disappearance of more than one indigenous group.

The Sápara, along with the Kichwa and Shiwiar mentioned above, have made it clear through multiple assembles, congresses, and in indigenous declarations that they do not want extractive industry, such as oil exploitation, in their territory. Gloria Ushigua, the current president of the Sápara Women’s association (Ashinwaka), has been leading the struggle to protect her people’s territory for a long time. Another factor that worsens the already urgent situation is that the Ecuadorian government has been drastically cracking down on organizations and civil society opposing oil expansion. As an outspoken voice, Ushigua has been targeted in public, harassed in her home, received threats and was included in a group of eight indigenous leaders who came under fire when formal complaints were filed with the Department of Justice. “We are currently fighting a battle against oil companies that enter our territories and threaten our very existence,” said Ushigua. “We have reached out to our allies, we are ready to fight with all the strength of our ancestors against the companies and government to protect the land from which we came, a land that must remain free from oil exploration.”

Because of the threats facing their people, the Sápara Nation organized a congress in Community of Torimbo where they nominated their own native leaders. This nomination was ratified by the Indigenous Sentence through the exercise of the Justice System in the Community of the Jandiayacu, with the participation of the Sápara elders who served as judges. This sentence was recognized by CONAIE and CONFENIAE, the Sápara's own government, in addition to CODENPE, the Council of Development of the nationalities and peoples of Ecuador. The Ecuadorian government however, through the Secretary of Political Management, is now pressuring CODENPE to not recognize this Indigenous Sápara Sentence. Critics believe that in order to exploit oil blocks 79 and 83, part of the Sápara territory, the Ecuadorian government is committing the offense of contempt towards indigenous justice (Article 171 of the Constitution of the Republic amongst others).

== Films ==
Talking with Fish and Birds – The Záparo Indians in the Ecuadorian Jungle, documentary, a film by Rainer Simon (1985 Golden Bear at the International Berlin Film Festival and GDR critics' award for the feature film "THE WOMAN AND THE STRANGER"), Director of Photography: Frank Sputh, Germany 1999, 43 minutes, A Simon/Sputh-Production
The Last Guardians, Social & environmental documentary, by "Tierra Productions" (Joe Tucker, Adam Punzano), 44 minutes, The Last Guardians offers a unique insight into the way that indigenous people live and see the world, and also a warning of what the world stands to lose if their rights and beliefs are not respected. The film tells the story of two tribes in the Ecuadorian Amazon as they struggle to preserve their culture and way of life against the encroachment of oil companies. Shot with the Sapara and Kichwa Nations, their messages resonate strongly in our era of climate crisis and environmental degradation, adding to the rising tide of awareness on the great value of indigenous knowledge at this time for the global community.

== Videos ==
A Message of Bartolo Alejandro Ushigua Santi – a former president of the Sápara Nation of Ecuador – in Spanish with the title “Becario Zapara ONU 2007 – Ecuador” you can find in YouTube, June 2007, 2 minutes.

A Message of Manari Kaji Ushigua Santi, son of Bartolo Alejandro Ushigua Santi – the current (2016) president of the Sápara Nation of Ecuador – in Spanish, subtitled in English, with the title "Sapara leader Manari speaks from the Ecuadorian Amazon 22.02.2106” you can find on YouTube, February 2016, 4 minutes, Author Susannah Darling Khan.
