= Finding Species =

US-based non-profit organization

Finding Species, Inc is a US-based non-profit organization founded in 1996 to contribute to the resolution of critical environmental, conservation and biodiversity issues through photography.

Finding Species maintained an international program in Ecuador from 2007–2012 to document and photograph the endangered flora and fauna of the rain forest. Currently, the American staff is based in Takoma Park, Maryland, and San Marcos, Texas.

== History ==
While conducting botanical research at the Bilsa Biological Reserve in Ecuador, botanist Margot Bass realized the importance and value in scientifically photographing the rainforest. Bass continued her work in 1996 in Ecuador's Yasuní National Park, where she and other botanists established Finding Species to document and conserve plant species.

The construction of roads and the exploration for oil in Yasuní National Park inspired Finding Species to partner with Scientists Concerned for Yasuní in publishing a report on the biological value of the park. The report included over thirty signature species of wildlife found at Yasuní. This report, as well as the accompanying public relations campaign involving photographs and international outcry, played a crucial role in the government's decision to stop the construction of the road. Resulting from many years of working within the rainforest is Common Trees of Yasuni, a book dedicated to the trees of Yasuní National Park located in Ecuador's Orellana Province.

Finding Species was formally incorporated in 2003 as a 501(c)(3) non-profit organization focusing on photography, science and conservation.

In 2010, Finding Species collaborated with Telfonica to release Armonia Ecuador, a coffee table book featuring photographs of various ecosystems and species throughout Ecuador. The book was released on March 3, 2011.

Finding Species has documented and photographed more than 250 tree species for the Smithsonian Institution, Columbia University and University of Maryland's leaf-recognizing iPhone app, LeafSnap.

== Collaborators ==
- Smithsonian Institution
- Canadian Wildlife Federation
- Columbia University
- Arnold Arboretum of Harvard University
- U.S. National Arboretum
- USGS National Biological Information Infrastructure
- The Center for Tropical Research
- CONGOPE (Consortium of Provincial of the Ecuador Autonomous Government)
- FONAG (Fondo Para la Proteccion del Agua)
- AVINA
