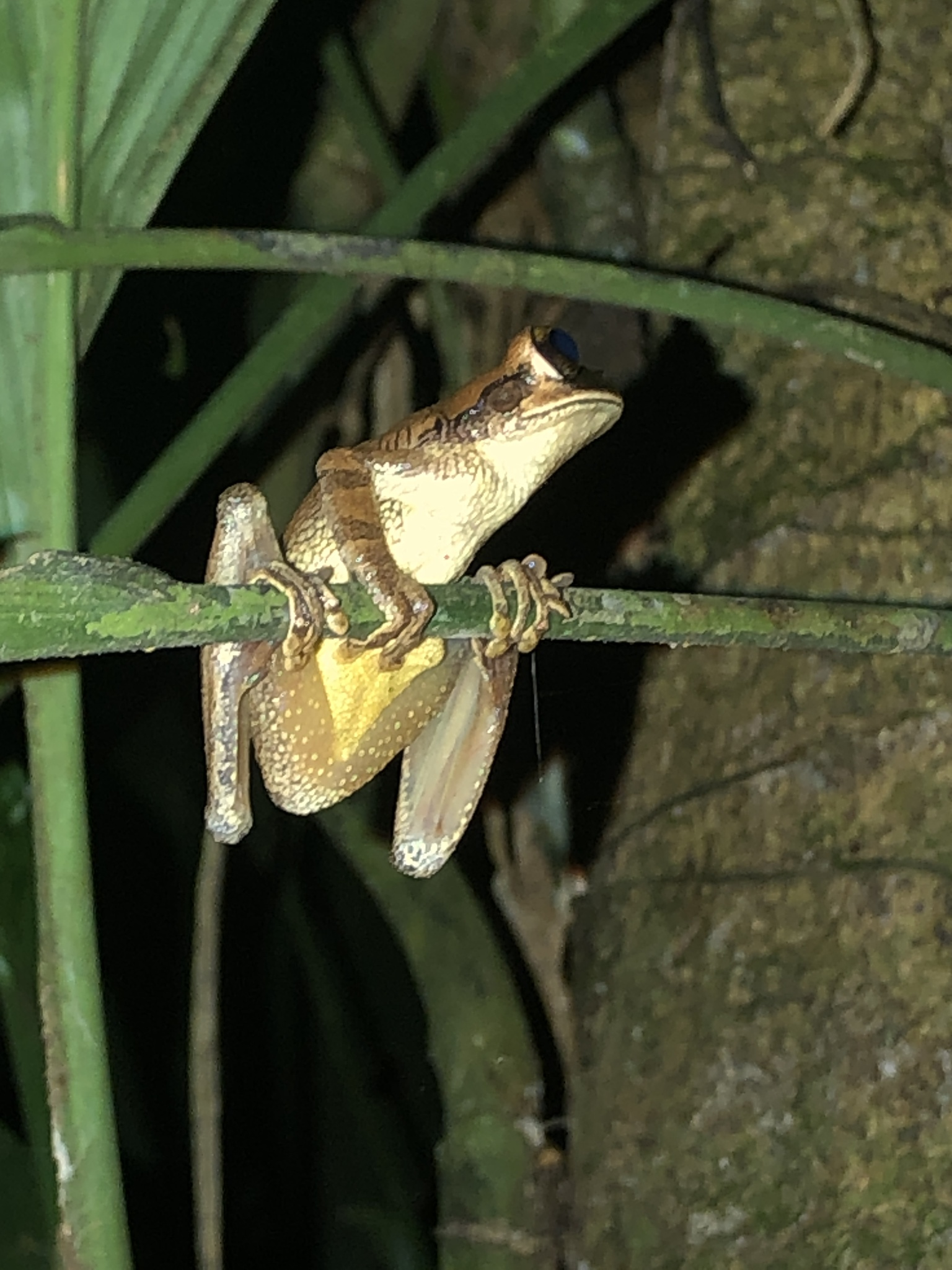

Conservation status
- Least Concern (IUCN 3.1)

Scientific classification
- Kingdom: Animalia
- Phylum: Chordata
- Class: Amphibia
- Order: Anura
- Family: Hylidae
- Genus: Osteocephalus
- Species: O. yasuni

Binomial name
- Osteocephalus yasuni Ron and Pramuk, 1999

= Osteocephalus yasuni =

Species of amphibian

Osteocephalus yasuni is a species of frogs in the family Hylidae. It is found in the upper Amazon Basin in southern Colombia (Amazonas and Caquetá Departments), Ecuador, and northeastern Peru (Loreto Region) at elevations of 70–250 m (230–820 ft) above sea level. The specific name yasuni refers to the Yasuni National Park where its type locality is.

== Description ==
Males measure 44–56 mm (1.7–2.2 in) and females 43–62 mm (1.7–2.4 in) in snout–vent length. The dorsum is brown with dark brown spots. The ventral coloration varies, from bright yellow to yellowish cream in adult males and cream in adult females. Males have rough skin while females have smooth skin. It has expanded discs on the fingers.

== Habitat and conservation ==
The species' natural habitats are tropical primary moist forests, in both terra firme and seasonally flooded forests. It breeds in temporary pools. It is nocturnal, although during some months males can be heard calling during the daytime.

It is locally affected by habitat loss, but there are no major threats to this reasonably abundant and widespread species. It occurs in a number of protected areas, including its namesake Yasuni National Park.
