= Yasu =

Yasu may refer to the following:

== People with the given name ==
- Yasu (illustrator), Japanese illustrator
- Yasu (musician), vocalist for the Japanese bands Janne Da Arc and Acid Black Cherry
- Yasu Akino, a Japanese supercentenarian
- Yasu Urano, Japanese professional wrestler

== Fictional characters ==
- Yasushi Takagi, a fictional character from the anime/manga series NANA
- Yasu, a fictional character from the video game The Portopia Serial Murder Case

== Places ==
- Yasu, Fukuoka, a town located in Asakura District, Fukuoka, Japan
- Yasu, Kōchi, a former town in Kōchi Prefecture, Japan
- Yasu, Shiga, a city located in Shiga, Japan
  - Yasu District, Shiga, a former district, now identical with the city
- Yasu River, a river in Shiga Prefecture, Japan

== Other uses ==
- The name for Jesus in some languages including Arabic and Swahili (the language spoken around East and Central African Countries) as spoken by Ahmadis and Christians (Yasū' or Yesu (يَسُوعَ)) and Malayalam (compare to the Hebrew "Yeshua")
- Yet Another Securom Utility
