= Tagaeri =

Eastern clan of the Huaorani people of Ecuador

The Tagaeri are an eastern Waorani people living in Yasuni National Park, in the Ecuadorian Amazon Basin, named after one of their members, Tagae. Nearby Kichwa communities sometimes refer to them as Awashiri, or "high-ground people". They live a hunting and foraging lifestyle and have resisted outside contact, making them one of the so-called uncontacted peoples of the world. In addition to Tagaeri, the area is home to their kin, the Taromenane, another eastern Waorani group.

== History ==
Tagae and his followers were among the Waorani families who separated off in 1968 after refusing missionary settlement, and have since lived in voluntary isolation. Contact with other Waorani has remained at a low level, but marked by bursts of inter-clan violence, e.g. 1993, 2003. In the 1990s, eastern Waorani groups moved westward, near to the Kichwa community of Curaray, in part to escape the effects of petroleum exploration and logging activity and possibly due to reduced game stocks. Curaray Kichwa, who occasionally see them but avoid interacting with them, say these are the Tagaeri, speaking a language like that of the western Waorani.

== Contact with the modern world ==
Attempts at contact by outside peoples have often been violently rebuffed, beginning with a series of attacks on the colonial settlement of Coca in reprisal for the attempted evangelization by the Summer Institute of Linguistics. The most recent such attack was the 1987 spearing of missionaries Alejandro Labaca and Inés Arango. In 2003, a Kichwa couple was speared on the banks of the Curaray river, and Kichwa say the perpetrators were the Tagaeri. More recently, the body of a 37-year-old rare wood poacher, Luis Castellanos, was found in March 2008 in the Yasuni area, with nine iron-headed spears jutting out of his stomach. According to local officials, the killers are presumed to have been Tagaeri or the Taromenani.

== Status ==
It is estimated that there are perhaps only 20–30 surviving Tagaeri. Together with the Taromenane, they make up the last two known indigenous groups living in voluntary isolation in Ecuador. Grave threats are posed to them by the possibility of foreign diseases. They are also threatened by illegal loggers of tropical hardwoods, smugglers, settlers, and oil companies moving into the area, with drilling taking place ever closer to their lands. On February 15, 2008, authorities in Ecuador agreed to investigate reports that five tribespeople belonging to the Taromenane and Tagaeri tribes had been killed by illegal loggers.

== Preservation ==
Entities attempting to protect the Tagaeri and other Amazonian peoples in the area include the Ecuadorian government's Yasuní-ITT Initiative, launched by President Rafael Correa in 2007. The Yasuní-ITT Initiative was ended in failure in 2013. On March 13, 2025, the Inter-American Court of Human Rights ruled that Ecuador violated several rights of this group. The case was filled in 2006 by a group of activists. The CONAIE joined the trial represented by Mario Melo Cevallos and David Cordero-Heredia.
