= List of countries by oil consumption =

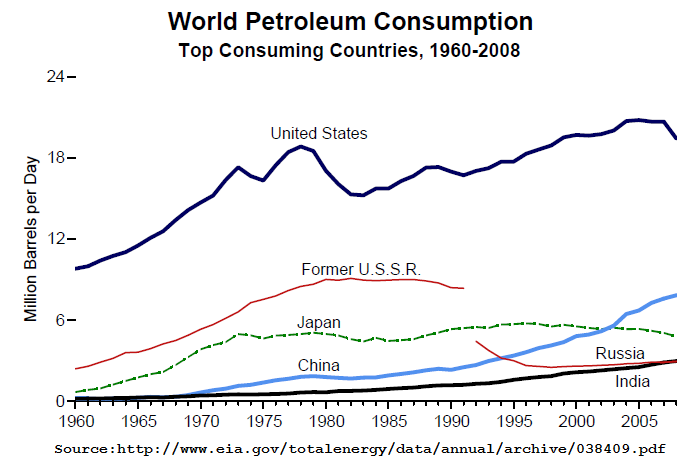
Petroleum: top consuming nations, 1960–2008

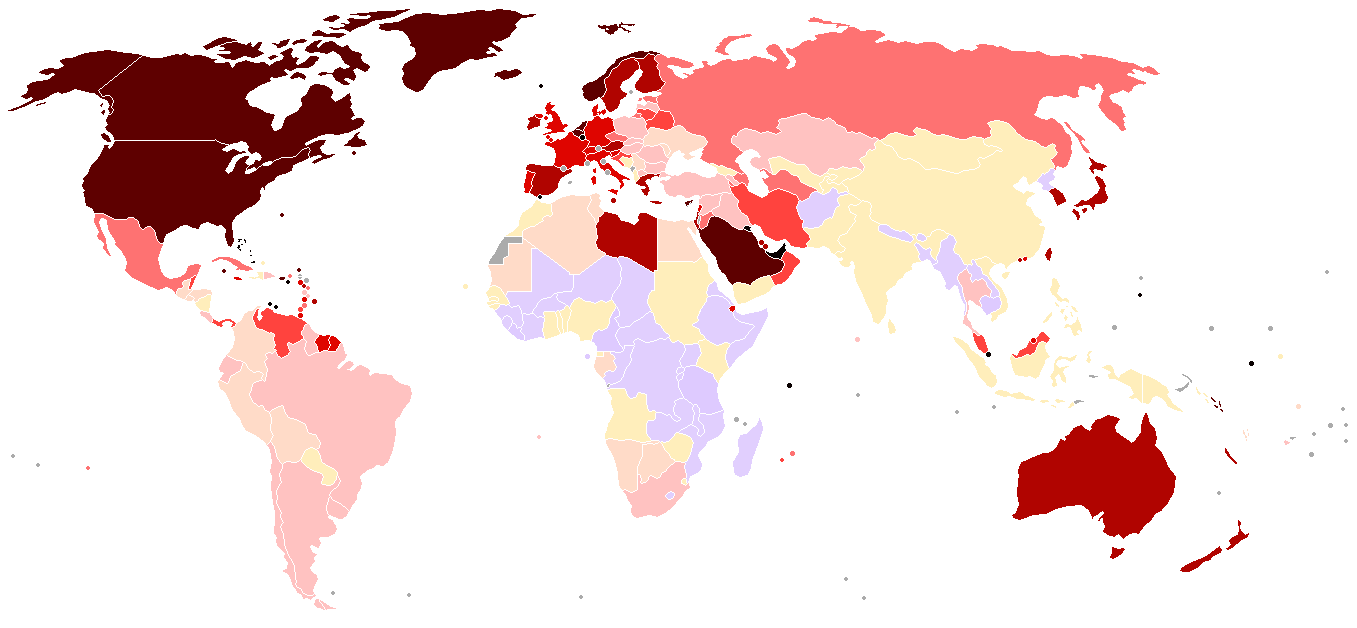
A map of world oil consumption in barrels a day per capita, 2007. > 0.07 0.07 - 0.05 0.05 - 0.035 0.035 - 0.025 0.025 - 0.02 0.02 - 0.015 0.015 - 0.01 0.01 - 0.005 0.005 - 0.0015 < 0.0015

Daily oil consumption by region from 1980 to 2006.

This is a list of countries by oil consumption. In 2022, the International Energy Agency (IEA) announced that total worldwide oil consumption would rise by 2% year over year compared to 2021 despite the COVID-19 pandemic.

| Country/Region | Oil consumption (bbl/day) | Oil consumption per capita (bbl/day/person) | Year | % |
|---|---|---|---|---|
| World (including biofuels) | 105,130,000 | 0.013 | 2025 | 100.000 |
| United States | 20,307,000 | 0.058 | 2026 | 19.262 |
| China | 16,189,000 | 0.011 | 2026 | 15.399 |
| India | 5,271,000 | 0.004 | 2026 | 5.014 |
| Russia | 3,863,000 | 0.027 | 2026 | 3.674 |
| Saudi Arabia | 3,524,000 | 0.100 | 2026 | 3.352 |
| Brazil | 3,163,000 | 0.015 | 2026 | 3.009 |
| Japan | 3,140,000 | 0.026 | 2026 | 2.987 |
| South Korea | 2,542,000 | 0.049 | 2026 | 2.418 |
| Iran | 2,415,000 | 0.026 | 2026 | 2.297 |
| Canada | 2,377,000 | 0.059 | 2026 | 2.261 |
| Germany | 2,062,000 | 0.025 | 2026 | 1.961 |
| Mexico | 1,741,000 | 0.013 | 2026 | 1.656 |
| Indonesia | 1,645,000 | 0.006 | 2026 | 1.565 |
| France | 1,536,000 | 0.023 | 2026 | 1.461 |
| Singapore | 1,514,000 | 0.256 | 2026 | 1.440 |
| United Kingdom | 1,406,000 | 0.020 | 2026 | 1.337 |
| Thailand | 1,397,000 | 0.020 | 2026 | 1.329 |
| Spain | 1,325,000 | 0.028 | 2026 | 1.260 |
| Italy | 1,245,000 | 0.021 | 2026 | 1.184 |
| Australia | 1,151,000 | 0.042 | 2026 | 1.095 |
| Turkey | 1,107,000 | 0.013 | 2026 | 1.053 |
| Iraq | 1,043,000 | 0.022 | 2026 | 0.992 |
| Taiwan | 954,000 | 0.041 | 2026 | 0.907 |
| United Arab Emirates | 846,000 | 0.073 | 2026 | 0.805 |
| Netherlands | 840,000 | 0.046 | 2026 | 0.799 |
| Egypt | 830,000 | 0.007 | 2026 | 0.789 |
| Argentina | 749,000 | 0.016 | 2026 | 0.712 |
| Poland | 743,000 | 0.020 | 2026 | 0.707 |
| Malaysia | 672,000 | 0.018 | 2026 | 0.639 |
| Pakistan | 645,000 | 0.002 | 2026 | 0.614 |
| South Africa | 609,000 | 0.009 | 2026 | 0.579 |
| Belgium | 596,000 | 0.051 | 2026 | 0.567 |
| Vietnam | 544,000 | 0.005 | 2026 | 0.517 |
| Nigeria | 527,000 | 0.002 | 2026 | 0.501 |
| Philippines | 457,000 | 0.004 | 2026 | 0.435 |
| Algeria | 446,000 | 0.009 | 2026 | 0.424 |
| Kuwait | 430,000 | 0.084 | 2026 | 0.409 |
| Chile | 404,000 | 0.020 | 2026 | 0.384 |
| Kazakhstan | 386,000 | 0.018 | 2026 | 0.367 |
| Colombia | 374,000 | 0.007 | 2026 | 0.356 |
| Greece | 308,000 | 0.031 | 2026 | 0.293 |
| Morocco | 296,000 | 0.008 | 2026 | 0.282 |
| Hong Kong (China) | 278,541 | 0.038 | 2024 | 0.265 |
| Ecuador | 272,000 | 0.015 | 2026 | 0.259 |
| Sweden | 270,000 | 0.025 | 2026 | 0.257 |
| Qatar | 268,000 | 0.084 | 2026 | 0.255 |
| Bangladesh | 263,000 | 0.001 | 2026 | 0.250 |
| Peru | 255,000 | 0.007 | 2026 | 0.243 |
| Austria | 244,000 | 0.027 | 2026 | 0.232 |
| Norway | 229,000 | 0.041 | 2026 | 0.218 |
| Romania | 220,000 | 0.012 | 2026 | 0.209 |
| Czech Republic | 219,000 | 0.021 | 2026 | 0.208 |
| Israel | 219,000 | 0.023 | 2026 | 0.208 |
| Oman | 218,000 | 0.038 | 2026 | 0.207 |
| Libya | 207,000 | 0.027 | 2026 | 0.197 |
| Venezuela | 203,000 | 0.007 | 2026 | 0.193 |
| Portugal | 200,000 | 0.019 | 2026 | 0.190 |
| Switzerland | 194,000 | 0.022 | 2026 | 0.185 |
| Ukraine | 192,000 | 0.005 | 2026 | 0.183 |
| Hungary | 179,100 | 0.019 | 2026 | 0.170 |
| Finland | 175,000 | 0.031 | 2026 | 0.166 |
| Ireland | 159,000 | 0.030 | 2026 | 0.151 |
| New Zealand | 154,000 | 0.029 | 2026 | 0.146 |
| Turkmenistan | 152,000 | 0.020 | 2026 | 0.145 |
| Denmark | 151,000 | 0.025 | 2026 | 0.144 |
| Dominican Republic | 146,000 | 0.013 | 2026 | 0.139 |
| Panama | 131,000 | 0.028 | 2026 | 0.125 |
| Sudan | 129,000 | 0.002 | 2026 | 0.123 |
| Belarus | 125,000 | 0.014 | 2026 | 0.119 |
| Myanmar | 122,000 | 0.002 | 2026 | 0.116 |
| Angola | 121,000 | 0.003 | 2026 | 0.115 |
| Cuba | 118,000 | 0.011 | 2026 | 0.112 |
| Guatemala | 117,000 | 0.006 | 2026 | 0.111 |
| Lebanon | 115,000 | 0.019 | 2026 | 0.109 |
| Kenya | 113,000 | 0.002 | 2026 | 0.107 |
| Uzbekistan | 111,000 | 0.003 | 2026 | 0.106 |
| Azerbaijan | 109,000 | 0.010 | 2026 | 0.104 |
| Tunisia | 104,000 | 0.008 | 2026 | 0.099 |
| Ethiopia | 102,000 | 0.001 | 2026 | 0.097 |
| Syria | 102,000 | 0.004 | 2026 | 0.097 |
| Bulgaria | 101,000 | 0.015 | 2026 | 0.096 |
| Bolivia | 100,000 | 0.008 | 2026 | 0.095 |
| Sri Lanka | 100,000 | 0.004 | 2026 | 0.095 |
| Jordan | 97,000 | 0.008 | 2026 | 0.092 |
| Ghana | 96,000 | 0.003 | 2026 | 0.091 |
| Puerto Rico (United States) | 94,400 | 0.029 | 2024 | 0.090 |
| Slovakia | 90,000 | 0.017 | 2026 | 0.086 |
| Gibraltar (United Kingdom) | 88,207 | 2.158 | 2024 | 0.084 |
| Serbia | 88,000 | 0.013 | 2026 | 0.084 |
| Côte d'Ivoire | 87,000 | 0.003 | 2026 | 0.083 |
| Tanzania | 85,000 | 0.001 | 2026 | 0.081 |
| Cambodia | 77,000 | 0.004 | 2026 | 0.073 |
| Bahrain | 72,000 | 0.043 | 2026 | 0.068 |
| Curacao (Netherlands) | 72,000 | 0.388 | 2010 est. | 0.068 |
| Honduras | 71,000 | 0.006 | 2026 | 0.068 |
| Nepal | 71,000 | 0.002 | 2026 | 0.068 |
| Croatia | 70,000 | 0.018 | 2026 | 0.067 |
| Lithuania | 67,000 | 0.024 | 2026 | 0.064 |
| Senegal | 65,000 | 0.003 | 2026 | 0.062 |
| Costa Rica | 64,988 | 0.013 | 2024 | 0.062 |
| Afghanistan | 58,000 | 0.001 | 2026 | 0.055 |
| Yemen | 58,000 | 0.001 | 2026 | 0.055 |
| El Salvador | 56,000 | 0.009 | 2026 | 0.053 |
| Paraguay | 52,000 | 0.007 | 2026 | 0.049 |
| Luxembourg | 51,000 | 0.074 | 2026 | 0.049 |
| Uruguay | 50,000 | 0.015 | 2026 | 0.048 |
| Malta | 46,802 | 0.085 | 2024 | 0.045 |
| Cyprus | 46,382 | 0.034 | 2024 | 0.044 |
| Mali | 46,000 | 0.002 | 2026 | 0.044 |
| Jamaica | 44,142 | 0.016 | 2024 | 0.042 |
| Slovenia | 44,000 | 0.021 | 2026 | 0.042 |
| Uganda | 44,000 | 0.001 | 2026 | 0.042 |
| Papua New Guinea | 42,716 | 0.004 | 2024 | 0.041 |
| Mozambique | 42,000 | 0.001 | 2026 | 0.040 |
| Cameroon | 41,000 | 0.001 | 2026 | 0.039 |
| Benin | 40,000 | 0.003 | 2026 | 0.038 |
| Mongolia | 39,000 | 0.011 | 2026 | 0.037 |
| Burkina Faso | 37,000 | 0.002 | 2026 | 0.035 |
| Democratic Republic of the Congo | 35,000 | 0.000 | 2026 | 0.033 |
| Bosnia and Herzegovina | 34,000 | 0.011 | 2026 | 0.032 |
| Georgia | 34,000 | 0.009 | 2026 | 0.032 |
| Zambia | 34,000 | 0.002 | 2026 | 0.032 |
| Zimbabwe | 34,000 | 0.002 | 2026 | 0.032 |
| Latvia | 33,000 | 0.018 | 2026 | 0.031 |
| Mauritania | 32,000 | 0.006 | 2026 | 0.030 |
| Guinea | 31,268 | 0.002 | 2024 | 0.030 |
| Kyrgyzstan | 31,000 | 0.004 | 2026 | 0.029 |
| Tajikistan | 31,000 | 0.003 | 2026 | 0.029 |
| West Bank | 29,310 | 0.005 | 2011 est. | 0.028 |
| Mauritius | 28,460 | 0.022 | 2024 | 0.027 |
| Nicaragua | 28,000 | 0.004 | 2026 | 0.027 |
| Trinidad and Tobago | 27,005 | 0.018 | 2024 | 0.026 |
| Estonia | 27,000 | 0.020 | 2026 | 0.026 |
| Guyana | 26,760 | 0.032 | 2024 | 0.025 |
| Laos | 25,000 | 0.003 | 2026 | 0.024 |
| North Macedonia | 24,000 | 0.013 | 2026 | 0.023 |
| Namibia | 23,000 | 0.007 | 2026 | 0.022 |
| Bahamas | 22,434 | 0.055 | 2024 | 0.021 |
| Guam (United States) | 22,006 | 0.129 | 2024 | 0.021 |
| Botswana | 22,000 | 0.008 | 2026 | 0.021 |
| Moldova | 22,000 | 0.007 | 2026 | 0.021 |
| Albania | 21,000 | 0.008 | 2026 | 0.020 |
| Madagascar | 20,000 | 0.001 | 2026 | 0.019 |
| Iceland | 19,000 | 0.047 | 2026 | 0.018 |
| Niger | 18,000 | 0.001 | 2026 | 0.017 |
| North Korea | 18,000 | 0.001 | 2026 | 0.017 |
| Suriname | 17,000 | 0.026 | 2026 | 0.016 |
| New Caledonia (France) | 16,920 | 0.057 | 2024 | 0.016 |
| Brunei | 16,338 | 0.035 | 2024 | 0.016 |
| Kosovo | 16,000 | 0.010 | 2026 | 0.015 |
| Togo | 15,690 | 0.002 | 2024 | 0.015 |
| Fiji | 15,411 | 0.016 | 2024 | 0.015 |
| Armenia | 15,000 | 0.005 | 2026 | 0.014 |
| Chad | 15,000 | 0.001 | 2026 | 0.014 |
| U.S. Virgin Islands (United States) | 14,251 | 0.171 | 2024 | 0.014 |
| Gabon | 14,000 | 0.005 | 2026 | 0.013 |
| Republic of the Congo | 13,000 | 0.002 | 2026 | 0.012 |
| Maldives | 12,787 | 0.024 | 2024 | 0.012 |
| South Sudan | 11,890 | 0.001 | 2024 | 0.011 |
| Haiti | 11,656 | 0.001 | 2024 | 0.011 |
| Sierra Leone | 11,142 | 0.001 | 2024 | 0.011 |
| Macau (China) | 10,870 | 0.015 | 2024 | 0.010 |
| Malawi | 10,525 | 0.000 | 2024 | 0.010 |
| Barbados | 10,498 | 0.037 | 2024 | 0.010 |
| Rwanda | 9,824 | 0.001 | 2024 | 0.009 |
| Montenegro | 9,000 | 0.014 | 2026 | 0.009 |
| French Polynesia (France) | 8,874 | 0.031 | 2024 | 0.008 |
| Aruba (Netherlands) | 7,642 | 0.071 | 2024 | 0.007 |
| Seychelles | 6,476 | 0.048 | 2024 | 0.006 |
| Equatorial Guinea | 6,337 | 0.003 | 2024 | 0.006 |
| Eswatini | 6,255 | 0.005 | 2024 | 0.006 |
| Somalia | 6,000 | 0.000 | 2026 | 0.006 |
| Cayman Islands (United Kingdom) | 5,831 | 0.076 | 2024 | 0.006 |
| Burundi | 5,727 | 0.000 | 2024 | 0.005 |
| Lesotho | 5,715 | 0.002 | 2024 | 0.005 |
| Faroe Islands (Denmark) | 5,288 | 0.094 | 2024 | 0.005 |
| Antigua and Barbuda | 5,019 | 0.053 | 2024 | 0.005 |
| Belize | 5,000 | 0.012 | 2026 | 0.005 |
| Eritrea | 5,000 | 0.001 | 2026 | 0.005 |
| Liberia | 5,000 | 0.001 | 2026 | 0.005 |
| Cabo Verde | 4,791 | 0.009 | 2024 | 0.005 |
| Djibouti | 4,775 | 0.004 | 2024 | 0.005 |
| Timor-Leste | 4,556 | 0.003 | 2024 | 0.004 |
| Saint Lucia | 4,429 | 0.025 | 2024 | 0.004 |
| American Samoa (United States) | 3,865 | 0.085 | 2024 | 0.004 |
| Bermuda (United Kingdom) | 3,771 | 0.059 | 2024 | 0.004 |
| Gambia | 3,640 | 0.001 | 2024 | 0.003 |
| Greenland (Denmark) | 3,531 | 0.063 | 2024 | 0.003 |
| Turks and Caicos Islands (United Kingdom) | 3,197 | 0.068 | 2024 | 0.003 |
| Grenada | 2,808 | 0.024 | 2024 | 0.003 |
| Comoros | 2,656 | 0.003 | 2024 | 0.003 |
| Guinea-Bissau | 2,443 | 0.001 | 2024 | 0.002 |
| Samoa | 2,308 | 0.010 | 2024 | 0.002 |
| Vanuatu | 2,194 | 0.006 | 2024 | 0.002 |
| Solomon Islands | 2,189 | 0.003 | 2024 | 0.002 |
| Central African Republic | 2,000 | 0.000 | 2026 | 0.002 |
| Western Sahara | 1,979 | 0.003 | 2024 | 0.002 |
| Saint Vincent and the Grenadines | 1,933 | 0.019 | 2024 | 0.002 |
| Saint Kitts and Nevis | 1,929 | 0.041 | 2024 | 0.002 |
| Tonga | 1,513 | 0.015 | 2024 | 0.001 |
| British Virgin Islands (United Kingdom) | 1,288 | 0.032 | 2024 | 0.001 |
| Dominica | 1,237 | 0.019 | 2024 | 0.001 |
| Sao Tome and Principe | 1,216 | 0.005 | 2024 | 0.001 |
| Cook Islands | 795 | 0.062 | 2024 | 0.001 |
| Falkland Islands (United Kingdom) | 755 | 0.218 | 2024 | 0.001 |
| Nauru | 602 | 0.050 | 2024 | 0.001 |
| Kiribati | 589 | 0.004 | 2024 | 0.001 |
| Saint Pierre and Miquelon (France) | 492 | 0.089 | 2024 | <0.001 |
| Montserrat (United Kingdom) | 335 | 0.077 | 2024 | <0.001 |
| Saint Helena (United Kingdom) | 72 | 0.014 | 2024 | <0.001 |
| Niue | 58 | 0.032 | 2024 | <0.001 |

== See also ==
- List of countries by oil extraction
- Peak oil
- Energy development
- World energy resources
