= Yasuní-ITT Initiative =

The Yasuní-ITT Initiative was a project that attempted to keep over a billion barrels of oil in the ground under the Yasuni National Park in the Ecuadorian Amazon. The initiative was launched in 2007 by Ecuadorian president Rafael Correa and offered a perpetual suspension of oil extraction from the Ishpingo-Tambococha-Tiputini oil field (ITT) in return for $3.6 billion from the international community (half of what Ecuador would have realized in revenue from exploiting the resources at 2007 prices).

Yasuni National Park is one of the most biodiverse places on Earth and is home to many Indigenous people, including Tagaeri and Taromenane people living in voluntary isolation from the world community. The aim of the initiative was to conserve biodiversity, protect indigenous peoples living in voluntary isolation, and prevent CO_{2} emissions. The ITT reserve had around 846 million barrels or 20% of the country's proven oil reserve. The initiative envisioned a transition to a sustainable economy, using the funds to create jobs in such sectors as renewable energy while protecting the region's biodiversity and social equality.

After receiving pledges totaling $200 million by 2012, the Ecuadorian government announced that it would move forward with the Yasuni-ITT Initiative. However, in July 2013, the commission on the Yasuni-ITT Initiative's progress concluded that economic results were insufficient, leading Correa to scrap the plan on August 15, 2013. Oil drilling began in the park in 2016, and in 2019 President Lenín Moreno expanded the drilling area into the buffer zone intended to protect Indigenous communities.

== History ==
The Yasuni-ITT Initiative was launched by president Rafael Correa of Ecuador at the U.N. General Assembly in 2007 and sought to prevent oil extraction from the Ishpingo-Tambococha-Tiputini (ITT) oil field within the Yasuni National Park. The Yasuni National Park, located on the eastern edge of Ecuador, encompasses a section of Ecuador's Amazon rainforest and is recognized as one of the most bio diverse regions in the world; as well as the home of several indigenous Amazonian tribes. An initial proposal to promote the sustainable development of the renewable resources of the National Parks in the Amazon rainforest of Ecuador, rather than extracting non-renewable oil resources, was published in 1994 by Luis Fierro. However, the Yasuni National Park is estimated to contain approximately 846 million barrels of crude oil, approximately 20% of the country's proven oil reserves. To prevent the environmental destruction caused as a result of oil exploitation, the government of Ecuador proposed a permanent ban on oil production inside the Ishpingo-Tambococha-Tiputini oil field in exchange for 50% of the value of the reserves, or $3.6 billion over 13 years to be raised from public and private contributions from the international community. By preventing the drilling of oil inside the Ishpingo-Tambococha-Tiputini oil field, the Yasuni-ITT Initiative sought to conserve the biodiversity of the region, protect the indigenous peoples currently living in voluntary isolation inside the Yasuni National Park, and avoid the emission of significant quantities of CO_{2} caused by oil production.

To administer the funds donated to the initiative, the Yasuni-ITT Trust Fund was officially launched on 3 August 2010 and administered by the Multi-Partner Trust Fund of the United Nations Development Programme (UNDP). The Yasuni-ITT Initiative was considered a potentially unprecedented victory for the environmental community as the first large-scale carbon abatement project carried out by a developing country with cooperation from the international community. In August 2013, however, Ecuador's President Correa canceled the initiative.

== Benefits of the initiative ==
=== Preserving biodiversity ===
Yasuni National Park is one of the most biologically diverse areas on earth. Scientists have discovered 655 species of trees in one hectare of land in the park, more than the total record of the US and Canada combined. It has been declared a world biosphere reserve by UNESCO. Some 4,000-plant species, 173 species of mammals and 610 bird species live inside the Park. "It contains more documented insect species than any other forest in the world, and is among the most diverse forests in the world for different species of birds, bats, amphibians, epiphytes, and lianas. Yasuní is critical habitat to 23 globally threatened mammal species, including the Giant otter, the Amazonian manatee, Pink river dolphin, Giant anteater, and Amazonian tapir... Ten primate species live in the Yasuní, including the threatened White-bellied spider monkey." Earth Economics has estimated that its environmental benefits would have a net present value of 9.89 billion dollars. It was also estimated that the environmental costs of oil production in the ITT would be at least US$1.25 billion in present terms. This latter estimate includes only the effects of deforestation, the loss of ecotourism potential and the non-timber-related services of the forest, and excludes a number of externalities of oil exploitation like spills, local pollution, and effects on public health.

Currently, there has been some drilling in the Yasuni area, which has caused deforestation, air, and water pollution. Oil roads into the forest have become a magnet for colonization and opened up the park to over-hunting and deforestation. There are hundreds of waste oil "lakes" in the forest.

=== Avoiding CO_{2} emissions ===
Leaving the oil underground would have avoided the emission of 410 million metric tons of CO_{2}.

== Environmental impacts ==
Media coverage and legal documentation are limited when it comes to oil spills in the Amazon. Petro Ecuador has been notorious at having more than 400 spills a year. The government needs to do due diligence, to make sure that oil companies change their management and especially their extraction practice to avoid oil spills.

== Social, cultural, and political impacts ==
The main group of individuals that will become most affected is the indigenous groups. Many foreign oil and gas companies have bribed with narcotics and liquor. The Ecuadorian indigenous do not possess the means to fight off against the foreign oil companies.

=== The history of the protection of indigenous people in voluntary isolation ===
Historically the Waorani, a semi-nomadic group of hunter-gatherers, have lived in the Yasuní National Park for centuries. However, after the introduction of Royal-Dutch-Shell workers in 1930 that lead missionaries to this land, the only remaining part of the Wanorani are the Tagaeri and the Taromenane. As oil mongers continued to come into their land as the years went on, the Waorani established the "Organization of Waorani Nationalities of Ecuador" (ONHAE) to expand their rights. The ONHAE requested that the government of Ecuador grant the Waorani legal title over their territory. They wanted control over their land so that they could bring the harmful oil exploitation in their land to a halt. However, the government saw the Waorani opposition to oil activities as harmful to the modernization of Ecuador. Oil companies used the justification that Ecuador's development was dependent on oil extraction to further their projects. However, as oil companies like Maxus continued to build roads to aid in their extraction efforts the Waorani claimed that the company was "destroying everything in their path: our culture, our territory, and our lives." Their cry for help in the form of an "oil moratorium" gained the attention of NGOs concerned with the biodiversity of the rainforest, and it led to the Amazonia por la Vida (Amazon for Life), which brought environmental problems in the Amazon to the forefront of the media. This began the open discourse between the Waorani against oil activities in their land.

Before oil exploitation began, however, the Ecuadorian government enacted the doctrine of terra nullius, a racist doctrine that provided legal justification for Europeans to annex territories that were inhabited by indigenous people. The terra nullius asserted legal and political rule over the indigenous and gave them no property or political rights. It claimed that they were "savages" who could not exercise political power over their land. Thus, the land was claimed by Europeans who exercised control over the indigenous populations and began oil extraction without consent or compensation to the local peoples. In the early 1960s, oil companies ignored local land rights, failed to mitigate pollution/damage to the Amazon, and allowed for the process of colonization of the Amazon to begin. All of these issues combined stripped indigenous people of large areas of their territory and endangered their cultural and economic way of life. In their opposition, local residents sought to participate fully in discussions with multi-national oil companies and national governments on the issue. While this discourse did not blossom fully in the 1960s, by the 1990s the political pressure that oil companies faced completely changed the way things were done. Oil companies and governments now had to pay attention to the social and environmental impacts of extraction and long-term interests of local communities. A middle ground between the Waorani way of life and governmental and oil company's interests were created. To create this middle ground the Waorani learned new languages, traveled to the United States, met with industry and government officials, created new indigenous federations and political practices, engaged with international science, and modified long-standing social and economic practices. Through these actions a discourse was created, leaving the old one-sided exploitation of the indigenous lands in the past. Although the Waorani still did not have complete control of their land and their destiny, the middle ground had given them some influence over their fate. The native people also seek employment in the oil industry, access to oil markets, and long-term investment in health centers, schools, and community development. However, they struggled to establish good conditions for new projects, such as monitoring environmental pollution, the establishment of clear land rights, and sharing of the profits from oil development. By ignoring the wants and needs of the native people, oil companies forced them to turn to political resistance as the only way to make themselves heard. In the 1970s native groups wanted to incorporate concern for damage of the Amazon into the planning and execution of development projects. They also sought local control over development projects as a way to incorporate sustainable practices in their land. These concerns were given little attention until the 1980s when the government began to recognize native land claims. Town-meetings held by the Waorani were run in a consensus style, and although this is a different practice compared to the rest of the world, national governments recognized these meetings as legitimate political proceedings. While there is still much that needs to be done in the way of sustainable oil extraction, the discourse between the local population in the Ecuadorian Amazon has increased dramatically giving them a voice and a say in what happens to their land.

As their influence rose the Waorani were able to stop exploration in two leased oil blocks in Ecuador. They also pushed the government in 2007 to prohibit oil, gas, and logging activities in the "Zona Intangible", which was 7,580 km^{2} of Waorani land. The grounds for this movement included not only contaminations of the Waorani land in the Amazon, but also the diseases, that were decimating the Waorani population, brought in by persons from the developed world. In a lawsuit against Texaco, lawyers pointed to the actual loss of money by oil companies after oil exploitation to prove that sustainable practices on the front end would benefit the company and the land. In the 1980s the average income per barrel of oil was five dollars, while the cost of reparations for the land were more than six dollars per barrel. The six dollars only covered local damages, it did not account for climate change and costs of carbon dioxide production, which also required payment for. These figures prove that indigenous concerns for the land are not only beneficial to the land, but also cost-effective. The story-line about respecting and preserving the land of the "last free people" is the corner-stone of the ever-changing discourse underlining the Yasuní-ITT project, and is used every time human rights activists claim that isolated groups are affected by new oil activities.

== Critical reception and support ==
Leonardo DiCaprio and Edward Norton as well as Michael Charles Tobias and Jane Gray Morrison supported the proposal.

The former Secretary-General of the United Nations, Ban Ki-moon, also supported the Yasuni-ITT.

== Closure ==
=== Abandonment of Yasuní-ITT Initiative by Ecuadorian government ===
In July 2013, Correa formed a commission to evaluate the Yasuni-ITT Initiative's progress to date. The commission concluded that the economic results were not sufficient. On August 15, Correa scrapped the plan citing poor follow through from the international community. "The world has failed us", he said, calling the world's richest countries hypocrites who emit most of the world's greenhouse gases while expecting nations like his to sacrifice economic progress for the environment. Through an executive order, he liquidated the Yasuni-ITT trust fund formally ending the initiative. During the six-year history of the initiative, only $336 million had been pledged, Correa said, and of that, only $13.3 million had actually been delivered.

On Wednesday September 7, 2016, the Ecuadorian government confirmed the start of drilling activity within the Yasuni-ITT block. Then vice president Jorge Glas led reporters around the drilling site managed by Petroecuador, the country's national oil company. As of July 2016, the whole of the block was estimated to hold around 1.7 billion barrels of oil.

=== Referendum campaigns ===
National law allows for a national referendum if a campaign can canvass signatures supporting it from 5% of the electorate. In October 2013, shortly after government approval for oil exploration in Yasuní-ITT, the anti-exploitation group YASunidos launched a campaign to collect enough signatures to trigger a referendum, with the proposed question: "Do you agree that the government of Ecuador should leave the crude of ITT, known as Block 43, below ground indefinitely?". By 2014, YASunidos had collected more than sufficient signatures to trigger a referendum, but the National Electoral Council threw out hundreds of thousands of signatures, saying they were duplicates or fakes.

YASunidos made allegations of "foul play" by its opponents, including plagiarism of their campaign pamphlets intended to confuse voters and an instance of abduction and assault by government officials against a YASunidos activist.

In 2018, environmentalists succeeded in forcing a referendum with the question, "Are you in favor of increasing the Intangible Zone by at least 50,000 hectares [123,550 acres] and reducing the oil extraction area in Yasuní National Park from 1,030 to 300 hectares [2,545 to 741 acres]?" The Intangible Zone protects Indigenous communities from oil extraction activities. Sixty-seven percent of voters supported the referendum. In May 2019, President Moreno signed a decree that expanded the Intangible Zone, but which did not reduce oil extraction and allowed construction of oil infrastructure within a buffer zone around where it had previously been prohibited.

== 2023 Ecuadorian Yasuní National Park oil exploitation referendum ==
A referendum on banning oil exploitation in the Yasuní National Park was held in Ecuador on 20 August 2023 alongside general elections. If the proposal was accepted, a progressive withdrawal of all activities related to oil extraction would occur within one year from the announcement of the official results, and the state would not be able to take action intending to initiate new contracts to continue oil exploration in the block. The referendum was a popular initiative demanded by indigenous communities for more than ten years before being finally validated by the Constitutional Court in May 2023.

The proposal was approved. The choice was seen as a blow to President Guillermo Lasso, who had advocated for drilling. State oil company Petroecuador will have to dismantle its drilling operations in the area in the coming months.

== See also ==
- 2023 Ecuadorian Yasuní National Park oil exploitation referendum
