= Taromenane =

Clan of the Huaorani people of Ecuador

The Taromenane are an uncontacted people living in Yasuni National Park, at the Ecuadorian Amazon Basin.

Together with the Tagaeri they make up the two last known indigenous groups living in voluntary isolation in Ecuador. The clan is believed to be distantly related to the Waorani people.

It is estimated there are 150–300 Taromenane still maintaining a nomadic lifestyle in the rainforest, and perhaps only 20–30 surviving Tagaeri, although these numbers are uncertain.

The Taromenane has recently been under threat from oil developments and illegal logging in the Yasuni National Park. In February 2008, authorities in Ecuador agreed to investigate reports that five tribespeople belonging to the Taromenane and Tagaeri tribes had been killed by illegal loggers.
