= Patricia Gualinga =

Ecuadorian human rights defender

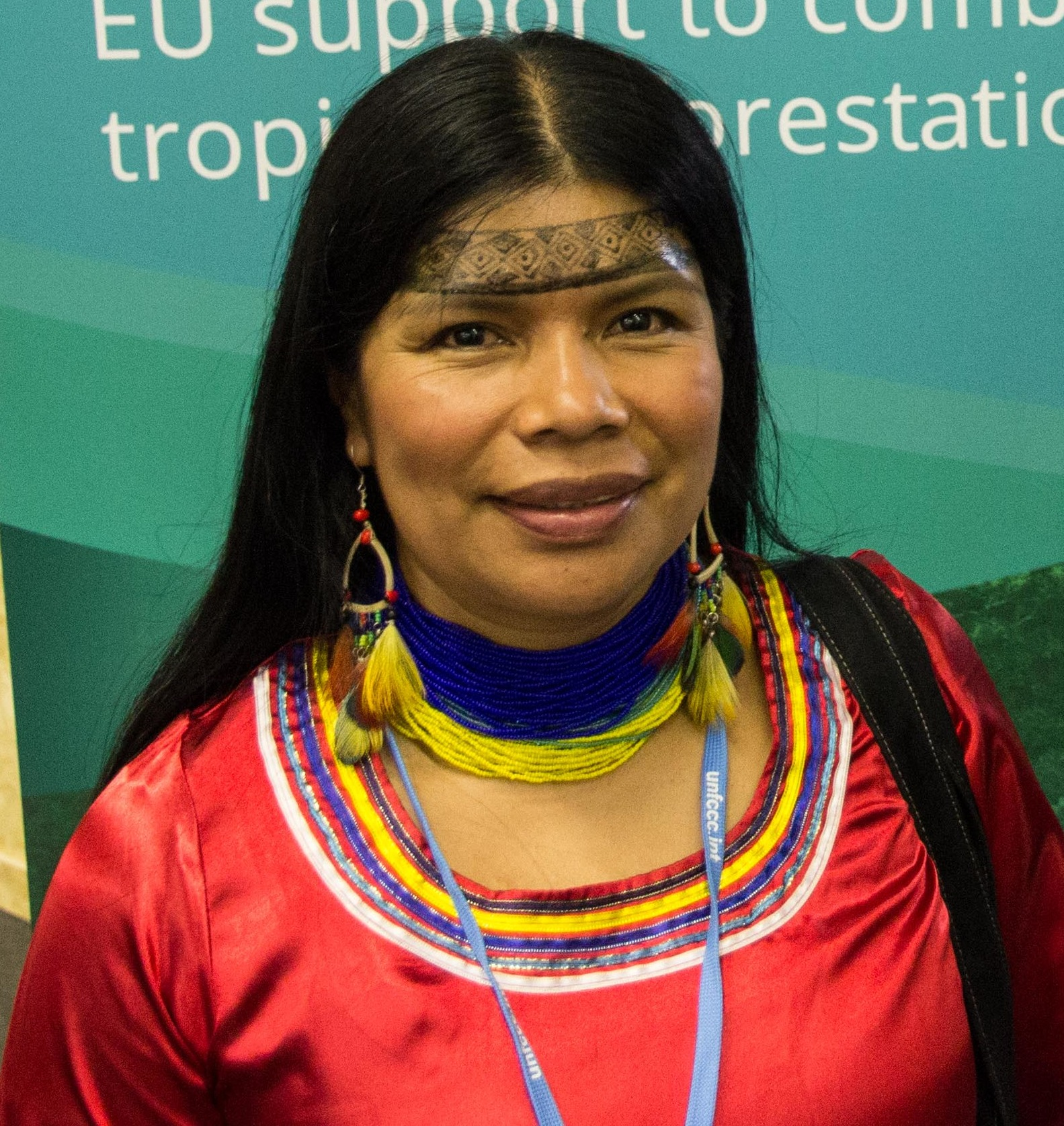
Patricia Gualinga

Patricia Gualinga (or Patricia Gualinga Montalvo) is a women human rights defender and indigenous rights defender of the Pueblo Kichwa de Sarayaku (Kichwa People of Sarayaku), an indigenous community in the Ecuadorian Amazon.

Patricia's nieces Nina Gualinga and Helena Gualinga are also environmental and indigenous rights activists. Her mother Cristina Gualinga is also a land defender, who passed down the family tradition. Her sister Noemí Gualinga, who has a lower profile as an activist, is a community leader, while her brother Eriberto Gualinga is a globetrotting filmmaker who documents the Sarayaku resistance.

Gualinga currently lives in cantón del Puyo, in the Pastaza Province of Ecuador.

== Activism ==
Gualinga is the International Relations director for the Kichwa First People of Sarayaku.

She has played an important role in the fight for indigenous rights. Gualinga is a spokeswoman for many environmental projects.

She led the women's group of the Pueblo Kichwa de Sarayaku (Kichwa People of Sarayaku) for six years. She worked to strengthen the organisation of women in the community; organised workshops and childcare for women attending the workshops to learn how to speak for the community, respond to media and respond to the arguments of industries and governments.

=== Inter-American Court of Human Rights ===
In 2012, Gualinga was one of the representatives in a case presented to the Inter-American Court of Human Rights (IACtHR). The Ecuadorian government authorized oil exploration by Argentinian oil company Compañía General de Combustibles (CGC), also known as the Argentinean General Fuel Company, on territory held by the Sarayaku, exploration which the community resisted through local protests and a court case. The community won this case, in which the Ecuadorian government was found guilty of human rights violations, having authorized oil exploration and militarization of Sarayaku lands without first consulting the community. The appropriation of community land for extractive industries without free, prior, and informed consent was found to have been illegal.

In 2018, Gualinga joined the Climate Change Summit of COP23, where had the opportunity to speak about Amazonian communities in Germany, expanding her connections and cause.

She is a spokesperson for the indigenous-led proposal 'Kawsak Sacha', or 'Living Forest', which calls for legal protection of the Ecuadorian Amazon.

Having successfully defended Sarayaku lands in the 2012 case, Gualinga currently works to protect the Kichwa People of Sarayaku and their lands from human rights violations resulting from similar oil extraction projects by Chinese companies.

== Death threats ==
Gualinga was the victim of a home invasion on 5 January 2018 by an unidentified man who entered by breaking a window with a thrown rock and shouted death threats at her, saying "the next time I will kill you". The attacker escaped, despite being chased by a policeman.

Many Indigenous rights defenders have previously reported threats and harassment as a consequence of their human rights work. In response, indigenous rights defense collective Mujeres Amazónicas (Amazonian Women) called for investigations into the intimidation of its members, delivering on March 9, 2020 over 250,000 signatures to the Attorney General of Ecuador and complaining about the stagnation of the investigations. Ecuador had ratified the Escazú Agreement in February 2020, a commitment to protect environment and land defenders by Latin American nations, which feature the highest rates of violent deaths for such activists, 116 environmental defenders having been killed in the region in 2017, according to a Global Witness report.
