= Nina Gualinga =

Ecuadorian human rights activist

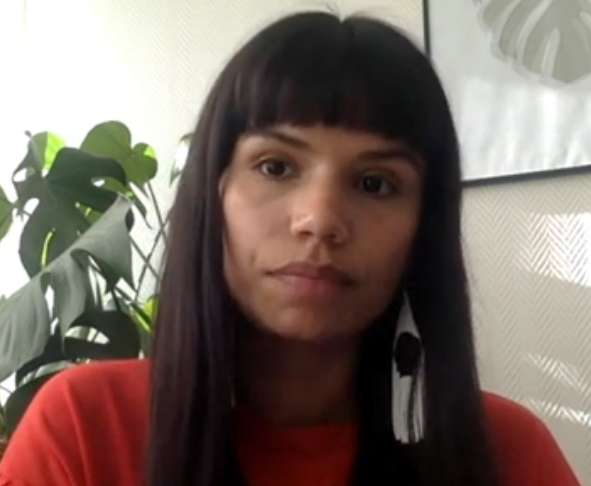
- In a UNOHCHR video in 2021
- Born: June 1993 (age 33); Sarayaku, Ecuador
- Education: Lund University
- Occupations: Climate Activist and indigenous rights Defender
- Known for: Environmental activism
- Relatives: Helena Gualinga (sister) Patricia Gualinga (aunt) Noemí Gualinga (mother)
- Awards: 2018 WWF International President's Youth award

Nina Gualinga (born June 1993) is an Ecuadorian environmental and indigenous rights activist. She is part of the Kichwa-speaking community and has spent most of her life advocating for better environmental protection of the Ecuadorian Amazon and the inhabitant wildlife as well as the people who are dependent on this environment.

== Personal life ==
Gualinga was born and raised in her mother's Kichwa-speaking community of Sarayaku in the Ecuadorian Amazon, in Puyo, Pastaza. Her father is Anders Sirén, a Swedish-speaking Finnish professor of biology in the department of geography and geology at the University of Turku.

Her involvement in advocating for climate justice and indigenous rights was inspired by her experience at the age of eight, when a representative of an oil company came to her village and offered them 10,000 dollars in exchange for drilling oil from their territory. She witnessed how the women of her village turned down the offer, advocating for the preservation of nature. At the age of eight, as the military had set their plan to invade the indigenous territory for oil exploration, she moved to Sweden. She studied at Sigtunaskolan Humanistiska Läroverket, a boarding school in Sigtuna, returning to Sarayaku during school holidays.

She gained her knowledge of the forest through her parents and grandparents. She is a granddaughter of Cristina Gualinga, and Gualinga's sister, Helena Gualinga, and mother, Noemí Gualinga are also environmental activists. Her aunt Patricia is also a land defender, and her uncle Eriberto is a filmmaker who documents the Sarayaku resistance.

She is currently studying human rights at Lund University.

== Activism ==
Her family was active in the Kichwa Sarayaku community's fight against the exploitation of the Amazon rainforest by companies and the Ecuadorian government. Gualinga's advocacy for indigenous and territorial rights started when an oil company with the help of Ecuadorian government military troops violently started exploiting her community's indigenous land. This intrusion led to a legal battle between the Ecuadorian government and Sarayaku community before the Inter-American Court of Human Rights, which eventually resulted to a victory for the Sarayaku community. At the age of 18, Gualinga represented the youth of Sarayaku at the final hearing of the case.

Gualinga had an indigenous fellowship at Amazon Watch where she developed the proposal for her own non-governmental organization aimed at empowering indigenous Sarayaku's youth and women, and to protect the Southern Ecuadorian Amazon. Her organization, Hakhu Amazon Design, sells handmade artisanal jewelry and accessories. She demands that the Ecuadorian government acknowledge the Amazon forest itself as an asset and for the government to end its contracts with major oil and mining companies.

She is also active as an indigenous rights activist on an international level, with a focus on protecting homes and land against corporate interests. She was part of a global call to stop fossil fuel extraction at the 2014 People's Climate March. She was also among the delegates advocating for "Living Forests" protection at the global climate conferences COP20 and COP21, in Lima and Paris respectively. In the course of COP21, she drew attention to her people's demands by sailing down the river Seine in Paris in a canoe from her village. In 2016, she was among a group of indigenous women from 7 nationalities that united to march in defense of indigenous rights and territories. Gualinga shed more light on the effects of climate change on the Kichwa people at the COP22 in Marrakech and encouraged the government to prioritize climate actions to reduce carbon emissions for the indigenous people. She was part of the Women's Earth and Climate Action Network (WECAN), Amazon Watch and Sarayaku Delegation to COP23 in Bonn and a speaker at the event. Nina was also part of the WECAN delegation at the COP25 climate negotiations in Madrid in 2019. At the event, she called for the world to refrain from extracting fossil fuels and to listen to indigenous peoples, who have protected their lands for millennia, for solutions to the climate crisis: "If we don't listen to indigenous peoples, if we don't listen to indigenous women we are not going to get out of this crisis." She gave a lecture on Indigenous People of the Amazon: The Guardians of Our Future at IAAC Auditorium, Barcelona on 25 February 2020.

== Awards ==
- 2018 WWF International President's Youth award
