= Noemí Gualinga =

Ecuadorian indigenous Kichwa Sarayaku community leader

Noemí Gualinga (born 1967 or 1968), known as "mother of the jungle", is a community leader of and activist for the Sarayaku, an Amazonian Kichwa indigenous group from the Ecuadorian Amazon numbering roughly 1,200.

Noemí is the sister of Patricia Gualinga, mother of Nina and Helena Gualinga, and daughter of Corina Montalvo and Sabino Gualinga, a family of Sarayaku rights defenders. She is married to Fenno-Swedish biologist Anders Henrik Sirén. They have lived in Puyo, Pastaza since 2017.

== Early life ==
As a young women, Gualinga worked in the Organization of the Indigenous Peoples of Pastaza. Starting at age 23, she featured in radio broadcasts in Puyo, giving out medical advice and advocating for the preservation of Kichwa culture.

== Sarayaku oil development conflict ==
In 1996, the Ecuadorian government granted Argentinian oil company Compañía General de Combustibles (CGC), also known as the Argentinean General Fuel Company, exploration rights to territory held by the Sarayaku without first consulting the local community. The company entered Sarayaku land in 2002 with the aid of Ecuadorian military and allegedly committed human rights abuses, such as threats of rape.

In response, the Sarayaku community, led by female leaders such as Gualinga, organized protests against the intrusions in 2003, and opened a legal case that was heard before the Inter-American Commission on Human Rights (IACHR). The Sarayaku were able to block oil development by constructing "Camps for Peace and Life".

On July 25, 2012, the IACHR ruled the State of Ecuador responsible for violating community rights of the Sarayaku and failing to obtain free, prior, and informed consent from the indigenous community, in accordance with international standards for indigenous consent before development projects, laws, or policies that would affect their way of life.

== 2020 flooding and COVID-19 pandemic ==
In 2020, as the COVID-19 pandemic began to spread among indigenous communities, the Bobonaza and Arajuno rivers flooded, heavily affecting the Sarayaku villages. During the quarantine period, from March to July, Noemí Gualinga organized daily missions to bring food relief from the city of Puyo to her home. She helped organize COVID-19 testing in Sarayaku.

== Other activities ==
Gualinga has led the Sarayaku Women’s Association, Kuriñampi (Golden Paths), since 2017. She coordinates the women's sales of jewelry and handicrafts. She is also a member of Mujeres Amazónicas, a collective for women defenders of natural rights.

Noemí appears rarely as a leader in photographs, but has taken part in protests such as those of March 2018 at the Carondelet Palace in Quito, where 60 women from 11 indigenous nationalities demanded an audience with President Lenin Moreno.

Gualinga continues to work as a community leader and provider of aid. In one instance, she helped a woman who had fled from her abusive husband, who had given their 12-year-old daughter to a man in a form of forced marriage long-running in indigenous communities.
