= Helena Gualinga =

Ecuadorian activist (born 2002)

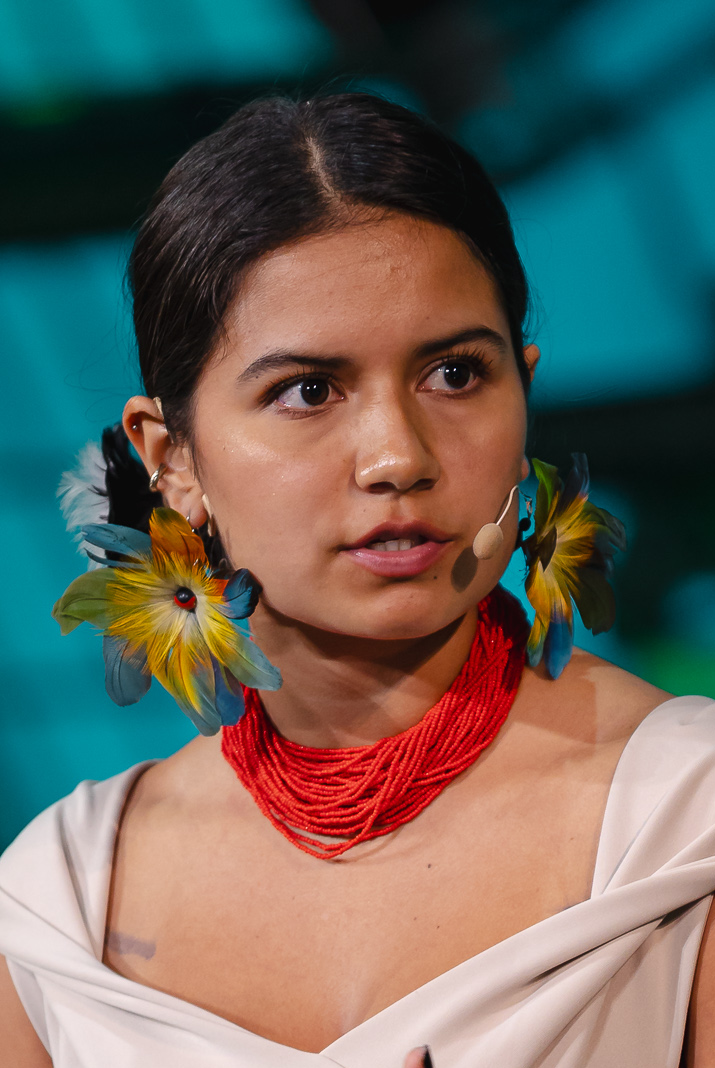
- Gualinga, in 2024
- Born: Sumak Helena Sirén Gualinga; February 27, 2002 (age 24); Sarayaku, Ecuador
- Occupations: Environmental and human rights activist
- Years active: 2019–present
- Website: Twitter; Instagram

Sumak Helena Sirén Gualinga (born on February 27, 2002) is an Ecuadorian environmental and human rights activist from the Kichwa Sarayaku community in Pastaza, Ecuador.

== Early life ==
Helena Gualinga was born on February 27, 2002, in Sarayaku. Her mother, Noemí Gualinga is an Indigenous Ecuadorian former president of the Kichwa Women's Association. Her older sister is the activist Nina Gualinga. Her aunt Patricia Gualinga and her grandmother Cristina Gualinga are defenders of Indigenous women's human rights in the Amazon and environmental causes. Her father is Anders Sirén, a Swedish-speaking Finnish professor of biology in the department of geography and geology at the University of Turku.

Gualinga spent most of her teenage years living in Pargas, Finland, and later in Turku, Finland, where her father comes from. She attends secondary school at the Cathedral School of Åbo.

From a young age, Gualinga has witnessed the persecution of her family for standing against the interests of big oil companies and their environmental impact on Indigenous land. Several leaders members of her community have lost their life in violent conflicts against the government and corporations. She has stated for Yle that she sees her involuntary upbringing in such an agitated environment as an opportunity.

== Activism ==
Gualinga has become a spokesperson for the Sarayaku Indigenous community. Her activism includes exposing the conflict between her community and oil companies by carrying an empowering message among the youth in local schools in Ecuador. She also actively exposes this message to the international community hoping to reach policymaker.

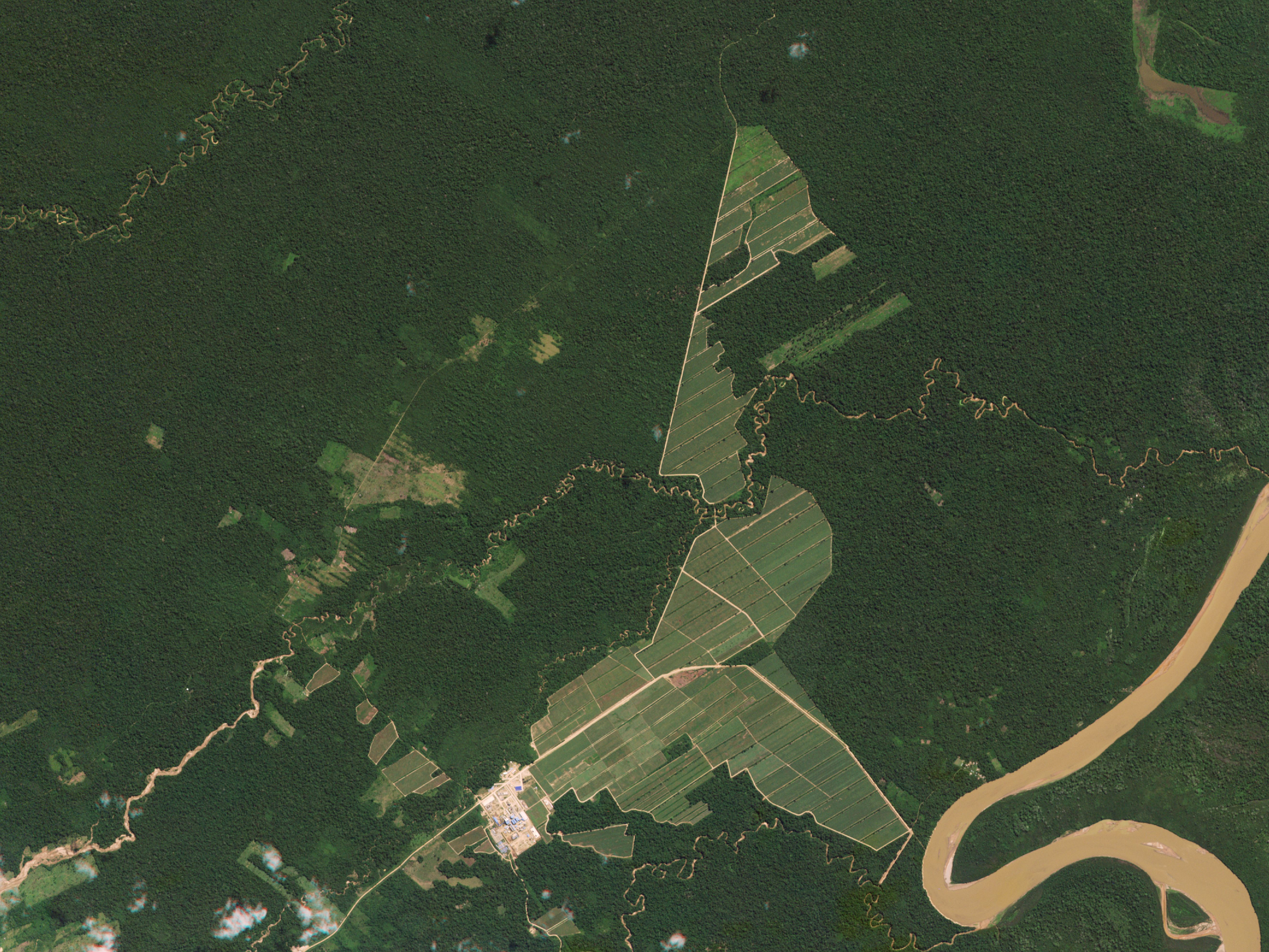
Deforestation in Bolivia, 2016

She and her family describe numerous ways in which they, as members of Indigenous communities in the Amazon, have experienced climate change, including a higher prevalence of forest fires, desertification, direct destruction and disease spread by floods, and faster melting snow on mountain peaks. These effects, she says, have been noticeable firsthand in the lifetimes of community elders. Gualinga describes that those elders have become aware of climate change regardless of their lack of scientific background.

Gualinga held a sign that read "sangre indígena, ni una sola gota más" (Indigenous blood, not one more drop) outside of the UN headquarters in New York City at a demonstration with hundreds other of young environmental activists during the 2019 UN Climate Action Summit.

=== Attendance in COP ===
Gualinga participated in the COP25 in Madrid, Spain. She spoke about her concern on the Ecuadorian government authorizing oil extraction in Indigenous land. She said: "Our country's government is still granting our territories to the corporations responsible of climate change. This is criminal." She criticized the Ecuadorian government for claiming interest in protecting the Amazon during the conference instead of attending Indigenous Amazon women's demands brought to the government during the 2019 Ecuadorian protests. She also expressed her disappointment towards world leaders' lack of interest to discuss topics brought by Indigenous peoples to the conference. Gualinga founded Polluters Out with Isabella Fallahi and Ayisha Siddiqa which aimed at fossil fuel industries. The movement was founded as a response to the failing of COP25. The movement's petition is to: "Demand that Patricia Espinosa, Executive Secretary to the United Nations Framework Convention on Climate Change (UNFCCC), refuse funding from fossil fuel corporations for COP26!". Gualinga returned to attend the COP26 as a member of Sarayaku Indigenous community, highlighting her critics of company, bank and government financing the destruction of Amazon and advocated that indigenous people became frontline to protect their forest against the extractive industries

== In popular media ==
Helena Gualinga is the protagonist of the documentary "Helena Sarayaku Manta" (Helena of Sarayaku), which documents her life and activism related to teaching the Sarayaku ways of living. The film was directed by Eriberto Gualinga and premiered on March 18, 2022 at the Environmental Film Festival in the Nation's Capital.

On April 4, 2022, Helena Gualinga and her sister Nina Gualinga were featured in Revista Hogar magazine. Their photographs were on the cover of the 691st issue of the magazine and according to Helena's social media, it was the first time ever that indigenous women were on the magazine's cover. On April 22, 2022, Helena Gualinga was pictured in Vogue magazine in an article on traditional Kichwa Sarayaku face paintings written by Atenea Morales de la Cruz.
