= Canelos =

Rural parish in Pastaza province, Ecuador

Canelos Parish
- Parish
- Interactive map of Canelos Parish
- Coordinates: 1.5905°S 77.7425°W
- Country: Ecuador
- Province: Pastaza Province
- Canton: Pastaza
- Time zone: UTC-5 (ECT)
- Climate: Af

Canelos is a rural parish of the canton of Pastaza, in the province of Pastaza. It is located to the southeast of the city of Puyo.

In the 1860s, Canelos was a canton itself, comprising the villages of Canelos, Sarayaku, Lliquino, Andoas and the Sapara and Jíbara tribes. In 1897, the "Oriental Region" was created, bringing Canelos into the province of Tungurahua. Eventually, the canton became a parish within the canton of Pastaza, now in the province of Pastaza.
