= Mera Canton =

- Canton
- Location of Pastaza Province in Ecuador.

- Mera Canton in Pastaza Province
- Coordinates: 1.46°S 78.09°W
- Country: Ecuador
- Province: Pastaza Province
- Capital: Mera

Area
  - Total: 530.4 km^{2} (204.8 sq mi)

Population (2022 census)
  - Total: 15,087
  - Density: 28.44/km^{2} (73.67/sq mi)
- Time zone: UTC-5 (ECT)

Mera Canton is a canton of Ecuador, located in the Pastaza Province. Its population at the 2010 census was 11.861. The canton is divided into 3 parishes: Mera, Shell and Madre Tierra. Its administrative capital is the town of Mera. However, most of the canton's population lives in the city of Shell (pop. 8.752). Rio Amazonas Airport is located in Shell and serves as a military base and hub for bushflying to remote communities in the Amazon.
