= 2016 Ecuadorian Army Arava crash =

Aviation accident in Ecuador

Ecuadorian Air Force Arava crash
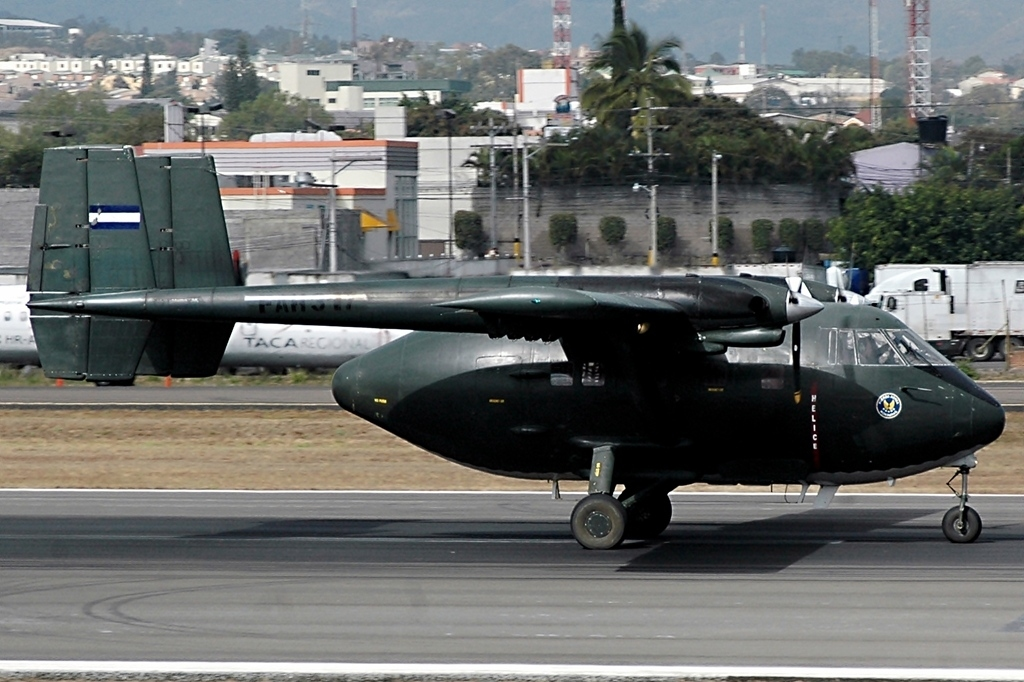
- An IAI Arava of the Honduran Air Force, similar to the crashed aircraft

Accident
- Date: 15 March 2016
- Summary: Crashed into high ground, poor weather
- Site: Hacienda La Palmira, Pastaza, Ecuador; 1°26′0″S 77°59′0″W

Aircraft
- Aircraft type: IAI Arava 201
- Operator: Ecuadorian Army
- Registration: E-206
- Flight origin: Río Amazonas Airport, Ecuador
- Occupants: 22
- Passengers: 19
- Crew: 3
- Fatalities: 22
- Survivors: 0

On 15 March 2016, an IAI Arava transport aircraft of the Ecuadorian Army crashed in the eastern part of the country. The accident is the deadliest involving an IAI Arava, and the single deadliest incident suffered by the Ecuadorian military.

== Accident ==
The Arava plane took off from the Río Amazonas military airport in Shell in Pastaza Province at 12:51 local time. It was carrying 19 Ecuadorian paratroopers belonging to the 9th Special Forces ('Patria') Brigade, for a skydiving exercise; as well as 3 crew members (2 pilots and a mechanic). The pilot had reportedly asked for permission to return to the airport due to adverse weather conditions shortly before contact was lost with the aircraft. The aircraft crashed at 14:30 local time in a mountainous area, killing all 22 on board.

Two Ecuadorian Air Force helicopters and ground patrols were dispatched to search for the missing plane, and the flight debris was located near the Fátima peak of Hacienda La Palmira.

== Reactions ==
Ecuadorian president Rafael Correa described the accident as a "tragedy" to the armed forces.
