= Our Lady of the Rosary Cathedral, Puyo =

Cathedral in Pastaza province, Ecuador

Our Lady of the Rosary Cathedral
- Catedral del Puyo
- Catedral de Nuestra Señora del Rosario
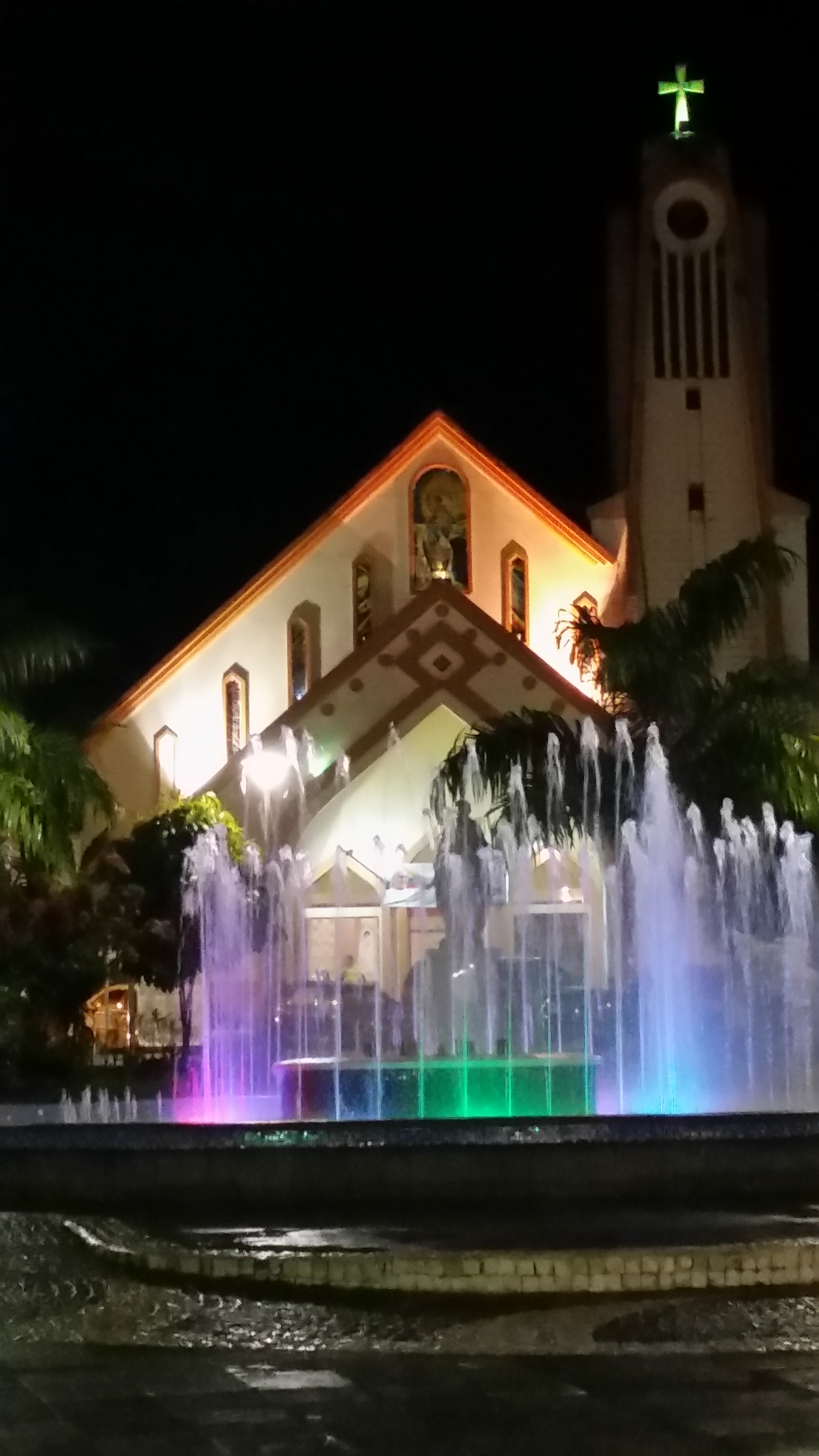
- Our Lady of the Rosary Cathedral
- 1.4855846°S 77.9965439°W
- Location: Puyo
- Country: Ecuador
- Denomination: Roman Catholic Church

The Our Lady of the Rosary Cathedral (Spanish: Catedral de Nuestra Señora del Rosario) also called Puyo Cathedral is a religious building that is located in the central district 12 de Mayo in the city of Puyo, Pastaza province, Ecuador.

The temple follows the Roman or Latin rite and functions as the headquarters of the Apostolic Vicariate of Puyo (Apostolicus Vicariatus puyoensis) which was created in 1964 with the Bull Apostolica praefectura of Pope Paul VI and whose current name dates from 1976.

Its construction took four years and was blessed and inaugurated on May 10, 1972 with the design of architect Reinaldo Flores. As its name implies was dedicated to the Virgin Mary in her title of Our Lady of the Rosary of Pompeii. It highlights its stained glass by an American nun.

== See also ==
- Roman Catholicism in Ecuador
- Our Lady of the Rosary
