= Pristimantis luscombei =

Conservation status
- Data Deficient (IUCN 3.1)

Scientific classification
- Kingdom: Animalia
- Phylum: Chordata
- Class: Amphibia
- Order: Anura
- Clade: Brachycephaloidea
- Family: Craugastoridae
- Genus: Pristimantis
- Species: P. luscombei

Binomial name
- Pristimantis luscombei (Duellman and Mendelson, 1995)

Synonyms
- Eleutherodactylus luscombei Duellman & Mendelson, 1995; Pristimantis achuar Elmer and Cannatella, 2008

Species of frog

Pristimantis luscombei is a species of frog in the family Strabomantidae. It is known from north-eastern Peru (Loreto, Amazonas, and Ucayali Regions), adjacent Amazonian Ecuador (Pastaza and Morona-Santiago Provinces), and from Acre state, Brazil. Some of the paratypes were later identified as belonging to another species, described in 2014 as Pristimantis miktos. At the same time, Pristimantis achuar was identified as synonym of Pristimantis luscombei.

== Description ==
Adult males measure 18–20 mm (0.71–0.79 in) and females 23–26 mm (0.91–1.02 in) in snout–vent length. There is a W-shaped, usually black dermal ridge in the scapular region. The dorsum is light to medium brown whereas the venter is immaculate yellowish white. The iris is bronze with black reticulation and with a reddish median stripe. Dorsal skin is smooth to finely shagreen. Pristimantis luscombei resembles Pristimantis kichwarum, but lacks the dark canthal stripe of the latter and has a blunter snout.

== Habitat and conservation ==
Its natural habitat is tropical moist lowland forests, mostly at elevations of 100–800 m (330–2,620 ft) but one record from 1,212 m (3,976 ft) above sea level. These nocturnal frogs are typically found on the leaves of herbaceous plants and bushes 0.1–1 m (3.9 in – 3 ft 3.4 in) above the ground. It is probably locally threatened by habitat loss.
