= Ayisha Siddiqa =

Pakistani-American climate justice advocate and legal researcher

- Siddiqa in 2022
- Born: 8 February 1999 (age 27); Jhang, Pakistan
- Years active: 2019–present
- Organization(s): Future Generations Tribunal , Planetary Guardians
- Known for: Climate justice and human rights research
- Title: Climate Advisor to the United Nations Secretary General
- Term: March 2023 – March 2025

Ayisha Siddiqa (born 8 February 1999) is a Pakistani-American scholar, environmental advocate and legal researcher on rights of future generations. She was appointed as the Youth Climate Advisor to United Nations Secretary General from March 2023 until March 2025, and has been an active voice in climate justice and international human rights advocacy since 2019, when she helped organize a large-scale youth climate strike in New York City. She is the recipient of multiple honors for her climate justice and human rights work, including TIME Woman of the Year 2023, The Independent Climate 100 List for two consecutive years, 2024 and 2025, and Business Insider's Climate Action 30 of 2023.

Siddiqa has contributed to environmental international law by developing policy submissions on the UN's Mitigation Work Programme, Just Transition pathways, and the New Collective Quantified Goal on Climate Finance, and founding the Future Generations Tribunal in 2023, a legal initiative to codify the rights of future generations. As part of that work, she served as the expert author on human rights for the People's Petition, a document submitted to the International Court of Justice as part of its advisory-opinion proceedings on states' human rights obligations related to climate change.

Currently, Siddiqa is pursuing a Juris Doctor Degree at UCLA School of Law, specializing in public interest and international law.

Through Future Generations Tribunal (FGT), Siddiqa and her team have collected citizen testimonies from young people around the world, starting with the People's Assembly in 2024 and the East Africa Future Generations Tribunal in 2025, documenting how the climate crisis affects young people's rights to a healthy environment, safety, and clean air, with the goal of producing legal declarations defining the rights of future generations.

== Early life and education ==
Ayisha Siddiqa was born on 8 February 1999, in Jhang City, Pakistan. Growing up in a matriarchal, tribal community near the River Chenab in eastern Pakistan helped shape her outlook. At 13, Siddiqa experienced firsthand the human cost of environmental degradation, after her community's polluted river water contributed to the death of her grandmother and two cousins, and to her uncle's kidney failure — an experience she has cited as the origin of her advocacy.

Siddiqa moved to Coney Island, Brooklyn when she was a child. She graduated from Hunter College with a Bachelor of Arts in Political Science and English in 2021, and was part of the Thomas Hunter Honors Program while there.

Siddiqa is now a Juris Doctor candidate at UCLA School of Law, specializing in human rights and international law as a merit-based Achievement Fellow and Public Interest Scholar. Her scholarship sits at the intersection of law, intergenerational justice, and global climate governance. She has also contributed to several published works, including "What Does Equity Mean to You?" in The Climate Book, edited by Greta Thunberg (Oct. 2022); "The Youth Activist's Perspective" in The Revolution Will Not Be Litigated (Nov. 2022); and "The Kids Are Alright" in What If We Get It Right (Sept. 2024).

== Advocacy and legal work ==
Siddiqa's advocacy began after she moved to the United States and continued to witness the effects of the climate crisis on her home community in Pakistan. During college, she co-organized youth gatherings for climate justice with students across the Tri-state area, and on 20 September 2019 co-led a major New York City youth climate mobilization ahead of that year's UN Youth Climate Summit, drawing an estimated 250,000–300,000 participants.

That organizing work led her, in 2020, to co-found Polluters Out with Isabella Fallahi and Helena Gualinga, a global youth coalition focused on strengthening accountability and transparency in international climate negotiations, and to help launch Fossil Free University the following year as the Research and Law Fellow for EarthRights International, an educational program covering energy transition law and policy, sustainable development frameworks, and civil society mobilization strategies.

Siddiqa has attended several UN Climate Change Conferences (COPs), including COP26 in 2021, where she spoke about barriers to participation facing delegates from the Global South, and was profiled by Atmos Earth, Vogue, and The Guardian for her work centering Indigenous, Black, and brown voices in international climate policy. The following year, she spoke at COP27's Children and Youth Pavilion.

By 2022, Siddiqa's focus had shifted increasingly toward rights-based legal research. She held a research fellowship at the Center for Human Rights and Global Justice (CHRGJ) at New York University School of Law, where she designed and led capacity-building programs for 50 grassroots advocates on international human rights law, climate science methodologies, and UNFCCC procedural frameworks. During the fellowship, she published work on climate vulnerability in Pakistan and on the mental health impacts of climate change on youth worldwide, framed through a climate justice lens.

At COP27, Siddiqa spoke as a human rights defender about the ongoing loss and damage from the 2022 Pakistan floods, calling for the climate risk finance framework to be finalized and for expanded climate finance commitments to lower-income countries. In a feature for TED Ideas, she argued that human rights and climate justice work must address the root causes of the climate crisis rather than only its symptoms.

In 2023, Siddiqa was named TIME's Woman of the Year for changing how the world thinks about climate action, recognized in particular for bringing poetry and storytelling into high-level policy conversations. That same year, while a research fellow at NYU School of Law, she spoke about the 2022 Pakistan floods as a keynote speaker at the World Economic Forum and at the UN Global Compact's Leaders Summit.

She was named to The Independent's Climate 100 list in 2024 and again in 2025.
