= Agoyán =

Ecuadorian waterfall

Coordinates: 1.4068°S 78.3093°W

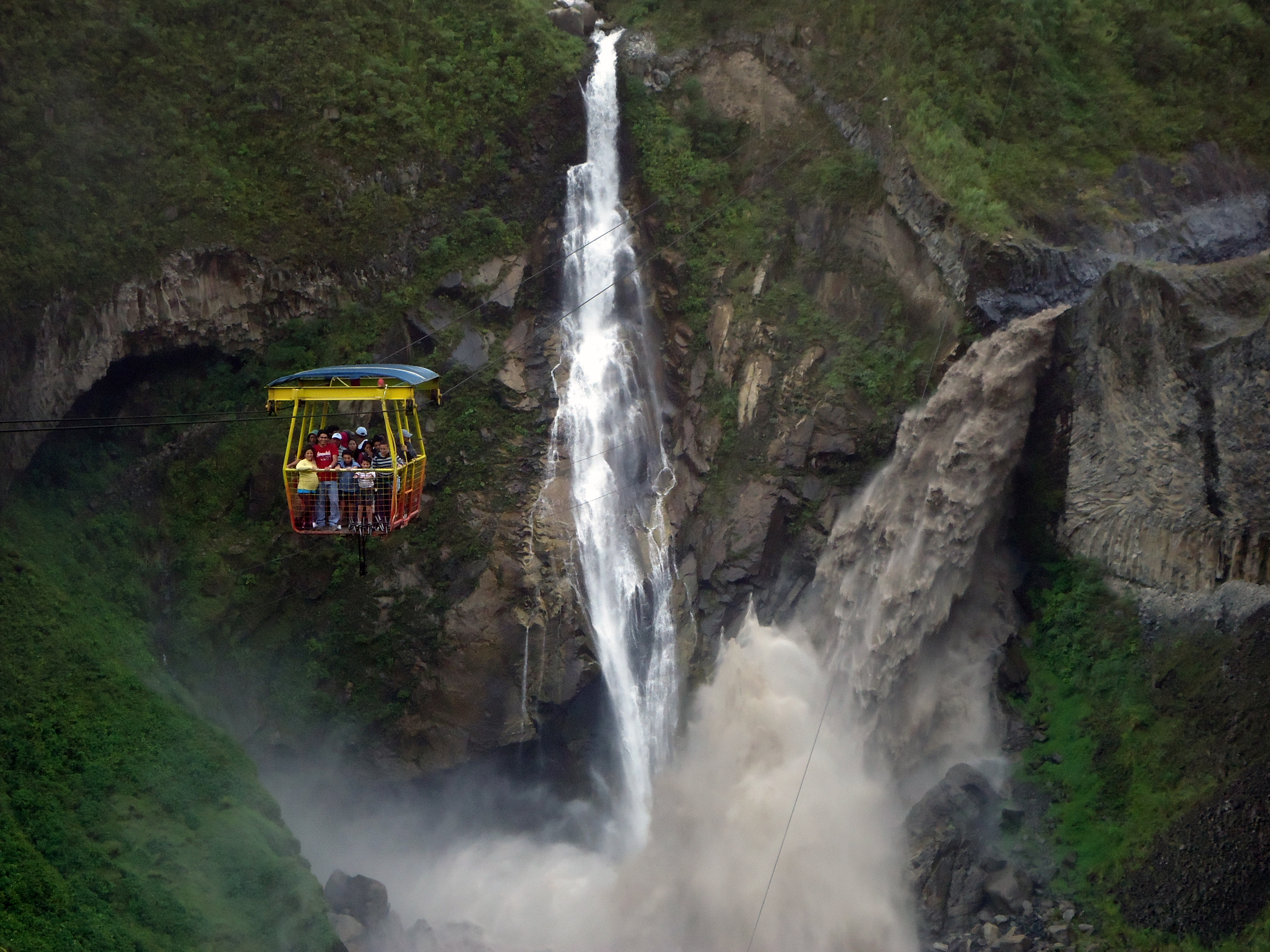

The Agoyán waterfall is a waterfall on the Pastaza River outside of the tourist town of Baños de Agua Santa in Ecuador. It is one of three significant waterfalls near the town.

In 1987, the Ecuadorian government inaugurated the Agoyán hydroelectric plant, which has been part of the country's power grid since then, with a total power output of 156 MW. The plant was built upstream of the waterfall, to preserve it.
