= Cristina Gualinga =

Ecuadorian human rights activist

Cristina Gualinga (born 1939/40) is an Ecuadorian environmentalist and activist for indigenous people known for her opposing oil development. She was the leader of activist organization Pacha Mama.

== Activism ==
In the 1980s, when American oil company ARCO/Oriente attempted to operate in the ancestral territory of the Kichwa Indigenous community of Sarayaku, in the south central region of the Ecuadorian Amazon, Gualinga and the Sarayaku community organized protests that led to an end in oil operations on their land in 1989.

A member of the Original Kichwa People of Sarayaku, she was a leader of the Organization of Indigenous Peoples of Pastaza. She took part in a 1992 March for the legalization of indigenous Amazonian territories. With her leadership, the Sarayaku won a case against the Government of Ecuador for violating their right to Prior Consultation in the Indigenous Territories. She was one of nine women, key to defending ancestral lands against government and corporate exploitation, who were depicted in a 50-metre (160 ft) tall mural in Quito by artist Mona Caron.

Gualinga has spoken to audiences abroad regarding her community. In a 1996 visit to Florida, she engaged in a speaking campaign at schools and churches about the destruction of the Amazon rainforest, millions of acres having been clearcut in the previous 22 years for oil exploration. Speaking from a female perspective, she noted that oil companies dealt with the men of the tribe, marginalizing the women. She bemoaned a breakdown in social structure, with some leaving for the cities and young women beginning to engage in prostitution. The introduction of money, alcohol, and other goods, she recalls, despoiled life in the formerly self-sufficient tribe. Oil spills contaminated the rivers. She has since continued speaking on indigenous rights and territories in the United States.

When Sarayaku territory was authorized for oil exploration by the Ecuadorian government in a 1996 concession to Argentine oil company Compañía General de Combustible (CGC), Gualinga once again worked to defend her community. Cristina Gualinga, along with Patricia Gualinga, came to request legal support against the intrusion upon their lands, while soldiers and CGC security personnel threatened and harassed the Sarayaku. Four community leaders were allegedly detained and tortured, and government officials threatened to militarize the town. The Inter-American Court ultimately ruled in favor of the Sarayaku in 2012, for which court case she was present among a group of Sarayaku.
