= Arajuno Canton =

Arajuno
- Canton
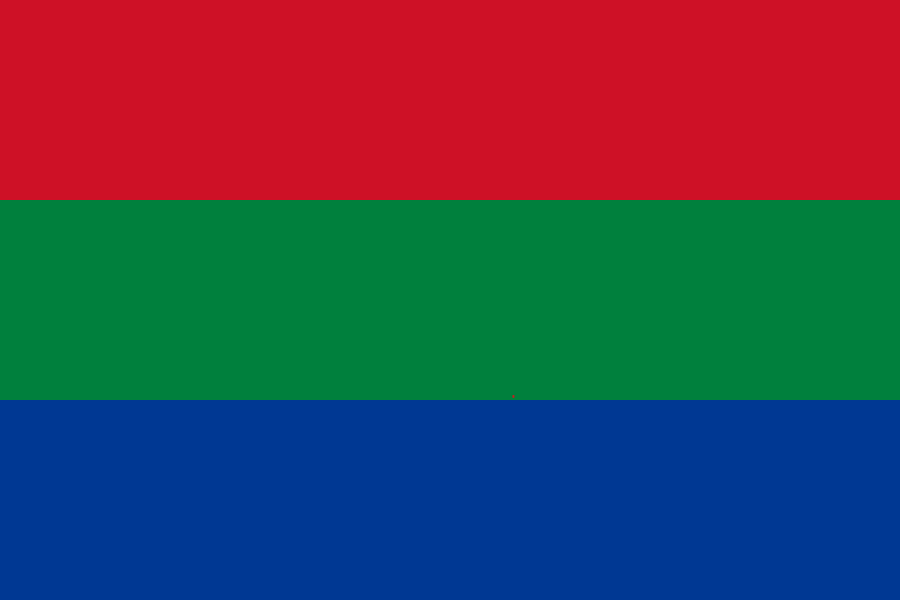
- Flag

- Location within Ecuador
- Coordinates: 1°14′28.8″S 77°40′52.9″W
- Country: Ecuador
- Province: Pastaza

Government
  - Mayor: César Grefa Aviléz

Area
  - Total: 8,816 km^{2} (3,404 sq mi)

Population (October 1, 2022)
  - Total: 9,553
  - Density: 1.084/km^{2} (2.81/sq mi)
- Time zone: UTC−05:00
- Area code(s): 1604
- Website: Official website

Arajuno Canton is a canton of Ecuador, located in the Pastaza Province. Its capital is the town of Arajuno. Its population at the 2001 census was 5,150.
