= Bobonaza River =

River of Ecuador

Coordinates: 1.6979°S 77.5544°W

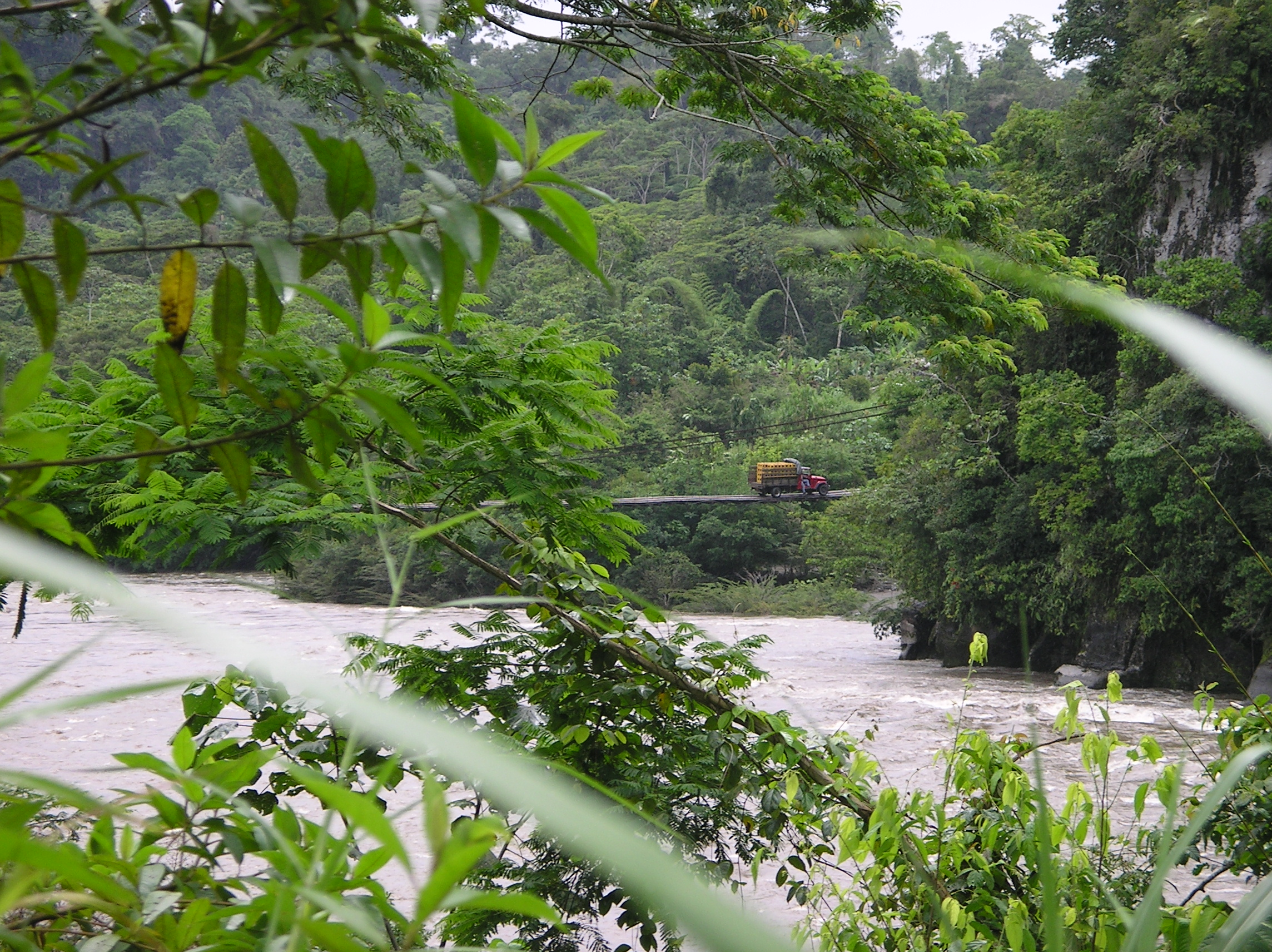

Location
- Country: Ecuador

The Bobonaza River is a river in Ecuador. It drains into the Pastaza River, and ultimately (via the Marañón River) into the Amazon River at Iquitos in Peru.

Its course runs mostly through Amazonian tropical rainforest, much of which is still sparsely populated. One of the few notable settlements along the Bobonaza River is Sarayaku.

== See also ==
- List of rivers of Ecuador
