= Río Amazonas Airport =

Airport serving Shell Mera, Ecuador

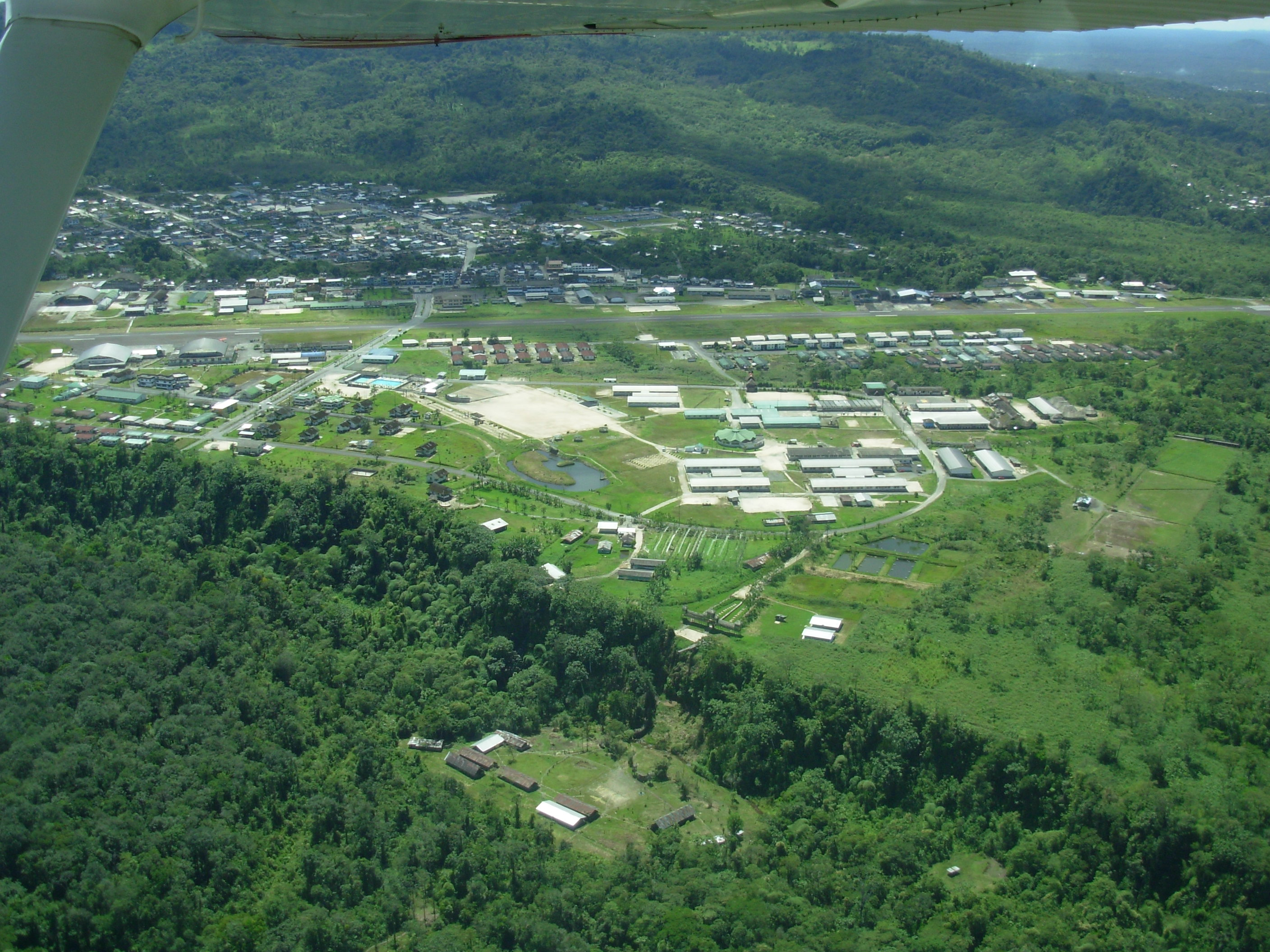
- IATA: PTZ; ICAO: SESM

Summary
- Airport type: Public
- Owner: Ecuadorian Military
- Operator: Mission Aviation Fellowship
- Location: Shell Mera, Ecuador
- Elevation AMSL: 3,465 ft / 1,056 m
- Coordinates: 1°30′19″S 78°03′46″W

Map
- Location of the airport in Ecuador

Runways
| Direction | Length | | Surface |
| Direction | m | ft | Surface |
|---|---|---|---|
| 12/30 | 1,540 | 5,052 | Asphalt |
- GCM

Río Amazonas Airport (IATA: PTZ, ICAO: SESM) is an airport serving Shell Mera, a town in the Pastaza Province of Ecuador. The airport was established in 1937 by Royal Dutch Shell and abandoned in 1948. In 1949 the Mission Aviation Fellowship, a Christian missionary group, established themselves in the area and used the airport as their main base.

== Accidents and incidents ==
In March 2016, a military plane taking off from Amazonas Airport crashed in Pastaza province, killing all 22 soldiers aboard.

== See also ==
- Transport in Ecuador
- List of airports in Ecuador
