= Santa Clara Canton =

- Canton
- Location of Pastaza Province in Ecuador.

- Santa Clara Canton in Pastaza Province
- Coordinates: 1.2671°S 77.8882°W
- Country: Ecuador
- Province: Pastaza Province
- Time zone: UTC-5 (ECT)

Santa Clara Canton is a canton of Ecuador, located in the Pastaza Province. Its capital is the town of Santa Clara. Its population at the 2001 census was 3,029.
