= IAI Arava =

Israeli light transport aircraft

Arava
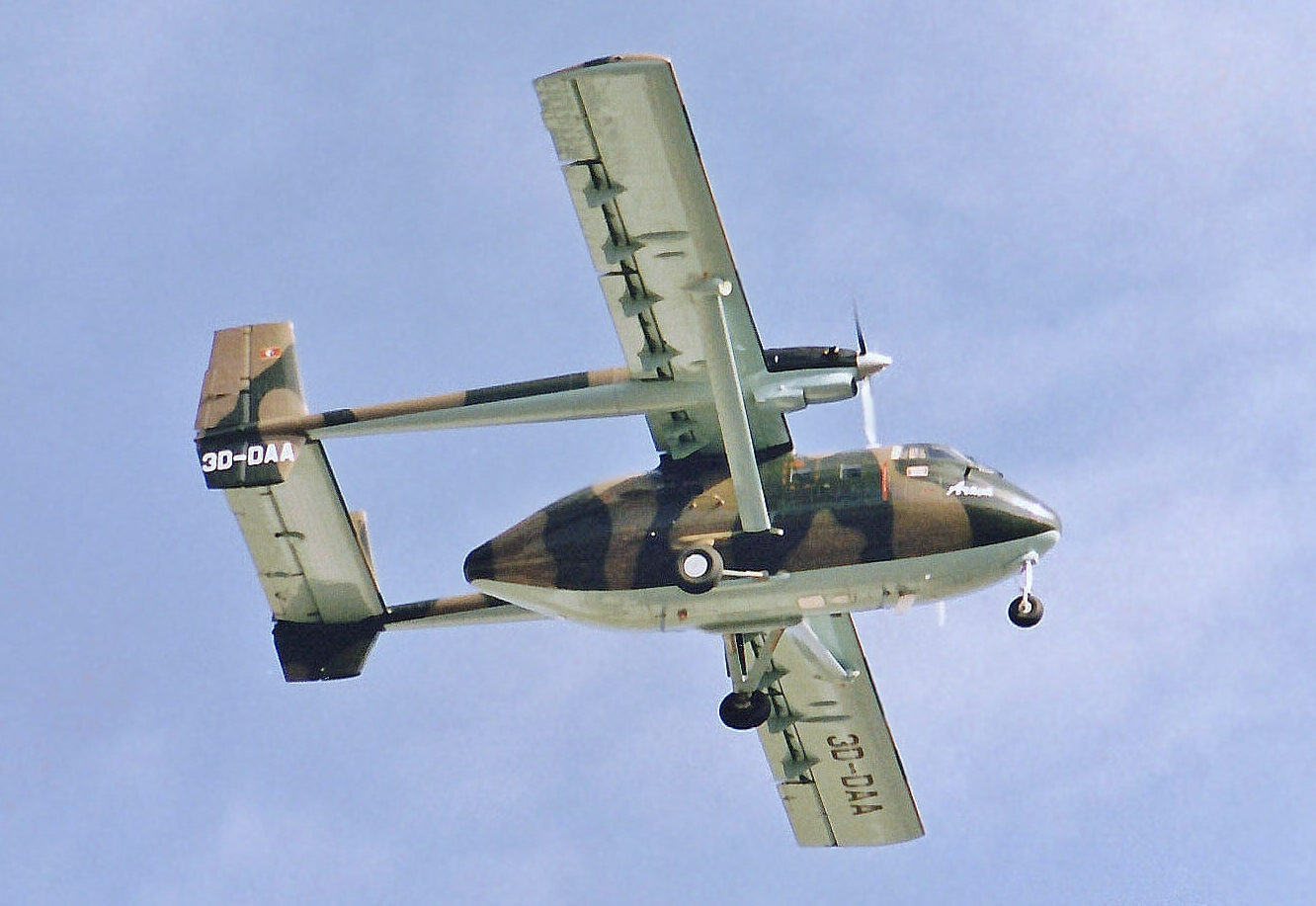
- IAI Arava of the Umbutfo Eswatini Defence Force

General information
- Type: Light STOL Transport aircraft
- Manufacturer: Israeli Aircraft Industries
- Status: Out of production, limited use
- Primary users: Israeli Air Force (IAF) 14 other militaries
- Number built: 103

History
- Manufactured: 1972–1988
- First flight: 27 November 1969

The Israeli Aircraft Industries Arava (Hebrew: עֲרָבָה, "Willow" or "Steppe" or "Desert", named after the Aravah of the Jordan Rift Valley) is a light STOL utility transport aircraft developed and produced by Israeli aerospace company Israel Aerospace Industries (IAI). It is IAI's first originally developed aircraft design to enter production.

The Arava had been developed during the 1960s, during which time it was intended to be adopted in large numbers by international customers in both the military and civil markets. Its design draws some influence from the French Nord Noratlas transport plane. Both the Israeli government and IAI's management were enthusiastic to develop the Arava, seeing it as a means of advancing the country's industrial capabilities as well as a source of revenue. On 27 November 1969, the first prototype performed its maiden flight; it would be destroyed on 19 November 1970 after a wing strut failed mid-flight due to excessive flutter. This accident has been attributed as being a major setback to both the Arava's development and its sales opportunities.

Despite an otherwise unremarkable development process, the Arava would ultimately only be built in relatively small numbers; many would-be operators, including the Israeli Air Force (IAF), determined that the aircraft lacked appeal over several existing market entrants. By 1973, the Arava programme and IAI were being heavily criticised for overoptimistic forecasting against its actual sales performance. Following an aggressive marketing campaign and new pricing strategies, multiple customers for the type were found, mainly amongst the developing countries, especially in Central and South America, as well as outliers in Swaziland (2018 renamed Eswatini) and Thailand. The IAF was largely unimpressed by the Arava, exercising a short-term lease of three aircraft during the Yom Kippur War of 1973; during the 1980s, the service opted to procure a small fleet of SIGINT-configured Aravas using American aid. In 2004, the IAF retired its Arava fleet. As of 2019, a handful of aircraft remain operational around the world.

== Design and development ==
=== Origins ===
According to aviation journalist and ex-IAI engineer Danny Shalom, substantial work on the development of what would become the Arava commenced right after the Six-Day War between Israel and several neighbouring nations. Prior to this point, Israel Aerospace Industries (IAI) had largely confined its aircraft manufacturing efforts to producing copies of existing French and American designs, such as the IAI Nesher. However, many of the company's engineers were keen to develop beyond imitation and reverse engineering effort, for IAI and Israel to produce its own unique and indigenously produced aircraft. Around this time, the company foresaw a requirement for a new generation of transport aircraft that would suit operations from runways only 400 meters in length. IAI had forecast the international market demand for such an aircraft to be massive and that, by obtaining only a 20% market share, the company would sell between 400 and 600 aircraft throughout the life of the programme.

As the design took shape, key performance objectives included Short-Takeoff and Landing (STOL) capability, the ability to operate the type from unprepared/rough airstrips, as well as the carriage of up to 20 passengers or bulky payloads. The Arava featured a barrel-like fuselage, being relatively short but wide, while the rear of the fuselage was hinged and could swing open for easy and rapid loading and unloading. Its wingspan was long and the twin tails were mounted on booms that ran from the engine nacelles. It was fitted with a fixed nosewheel undercarriage to save weight, while the chosen powerplant was a pair of 715 eshp (533 kW) Pratt & Whitney Canada PT6A-27 turboprop engines. The design configuration bore considerable similarity to the French Nord Noratlas transport plane, which was already being used at that time by the Israeli Air Force (IAF).

During June 1968, the Israeli government, headed by Labor leader Levi Eshkol, issued its approval of the initiative, authorising IAI to proceed with full-scale development. The Arava was viewed not only as a sellable product in its own right, but also as a means of enhancing IAI's ability to develop aircraft and thus would heavily influence its work on future projects.

=== Flight testing and sales effort ===
On 27 November 1969, the first prototype Arava made its maiden flight, flown by IAI's chief test pilot Avraham Hacohen. This aircraft would perform another 92 flights before tragedy struck the test programme; on 19 November 1970, the first prototype was destroyed during a high speed test flight when a wing strut failed due to excessive flutter, killing most of the crew on board, including Hacohen. IAI's engineers had previously disagreed over the strength of the wing's structure, but several tests had validated the wing's design to be sufficient. Flight testing was suspended for one year, while IAF pilot Danny Shapira took Hacohen's position as chief test pilot. Shapira later noted that the accident had generated significant doubt over the aircraft's suitability, both internally and externally, which made the aircraft considerably more difficult for IAI to sell. On 8 May 1971, the second prototype conducted its first flight.

While IAI had anticipated considerable demand for the Arava from the civilian market, customers quickly proved to be elusive. In comparison to the older Nord, IAI's new aircraft was not only slower but possessed barely more than half the endurance. Due to its inferior performance to existing transport aircraft, IAI soon concluded that the Arava possessed little appeal to any civil operators, and turned its efforts towards the military market instead. The IAF failed to take any meaningful interest in the type; in one exchange, Motti Hod, commander of the IAF, revealed that he had never even heard of the Arava. IAI, realising that a sale to the IAF was of substantial value in the eyes of prospective export customers, attempted to market the type for various needs, including air ambulance, search and rescue operations, troop-transport and utility missions.

By 1973, the lack of orders for the Arava, which was viewed by some as IAI's flagship programme, had become a subject of national criticism. Journalists noted that IAI's sales projections had been considerably more optimistic than those of several independent economists. Yitzhak Ernst Nebenzahl, Israel's state comptroller at the time, made several critical observations of the programme, attributing its failure to IAI's senior management, particularly in the failure to critique its own forecasts. IAI, being keen to validate both itself and the Arava, dispatched a team of test pilots and marketing staff on a flying tour of the Americas using the Arava, visiting various nations, including Mexico, Bolivia, Ecuador, Chile, Argentina, Honduras, Nicaragua, and Paraguay, to demonstrate the type directly to potential customers. These demonstrations were not without risk, as test pilots would occasionally fly the plane outside of its safe flying envelope in order to impress customers; this led to an Arava being destroyed in Malawi during one such flight in 1980.

The intensive marketing campaign, along with a decrease in unit prices and the adoption of new payment schemes, was able to yield a degree of success; ultimately, IAI would sell around 70 Aravas across various South American customers. During October 1980, IAI struck an agreement with American aviation company Consolidated Aircraft for the latter to act as the exclusive distributor for the Arava in the United States; Consolidated announced that it expected that sales of the type, which it marketed under the name Commuter liner, had been anticipated as 20 aircraft within the first year, mainly to the expanding commuter airline industry.

== Operational history ==
During October 1973, three aircraft were leased by IAI to the IAF to help meet demand during the Yom Kippur War. These aircraft, which were assigned to Squadron 122, were flown by IAI pilots and were typically used to fly transport and CASEVAC operations to and from the front lines. This leasing arrangement was terminated shortly after hostilities came to an end, the aircraft themselves being returned to IAI. Despite this, the IAF continued to be unenthusiastic about the type's potential in a utility transport mission, seeing little use for its STOL capabilities. However, during 1983, the service opted to acquire nine aircraft for Signals Intelligence (SIGINT) operations. All of these aircraft were flown to the United States, where they were fitted with various American-sourced electronics and onboard systems to perform the intelligence mission; a likely factor in this decision was that the IAF's acquisition had been financed via US aid.

During 1988, production of the type was terminated; only 103 Arava aircraft were produced, of which 70 had been for the military market. As of 2019, a limited number of Aravas is still in operation in some countries. During 2004, the IAF announced that the imminent withdrawal of its remaining Arava fleet. Since then, the service has made prolonged efforts to dispose of the grounded aircraft.

== Variants ==
IAI 101
Civil-transport version
IAI 101A
Civil transport version, one built
IAI 101B
Civil transport version
IAI 102
Civil passenger aircraft for up to 20 people in airline-standard configuration or up to 12 passengers in VIP configuration
IAI 102B
Civil transport version
IAI 201
Military transport version
IAI 202
Variant with winglets and an APU
IAI 203
Proposed jet-powered version, not built.
IAI 301
Proposed Turbomeca Astazou powered variant, not built.
IAI 401
Proposed larger variant with PT-6A engines, not built.
B.TL.7
(Thai: บ.ตล.๗) Royal Thai Armed Forces designation for the IAI 201.

The military version could also be equipped with a range of weapons, in order to act in anti-submarine- or gunship roles. The weapon configuration could include two machine guns in fuselage side packs (usually 0.5" Browning), plus a third gun on the rear fuselage, and two pods containing 6 x 82 mm rocket pods or torpedoes or sonar buoys on the fuselage sides.

Another less known military version is the 202B Electronic warfare model. This version was made in small numbers, and had distinct large radomes at each end of the fuselage. The radomes contained the Electronic Warfare mission systems.

== Operators ==
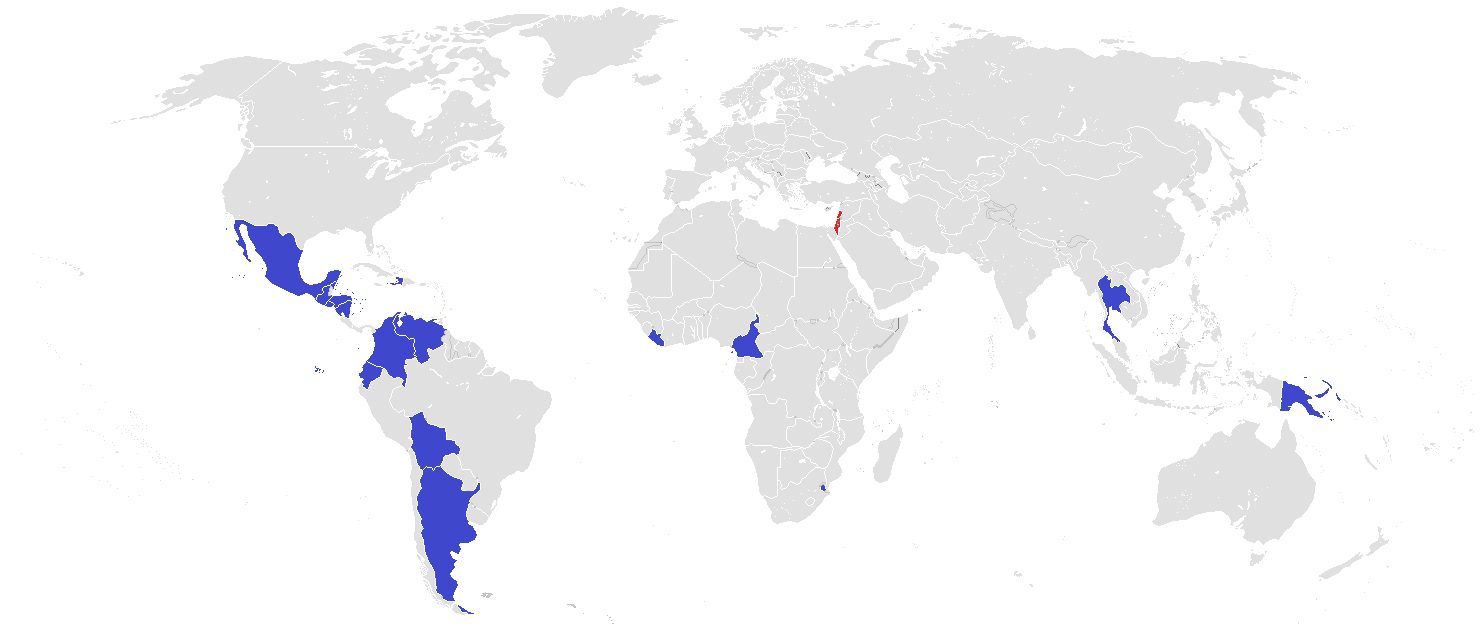
IAI Arava operators

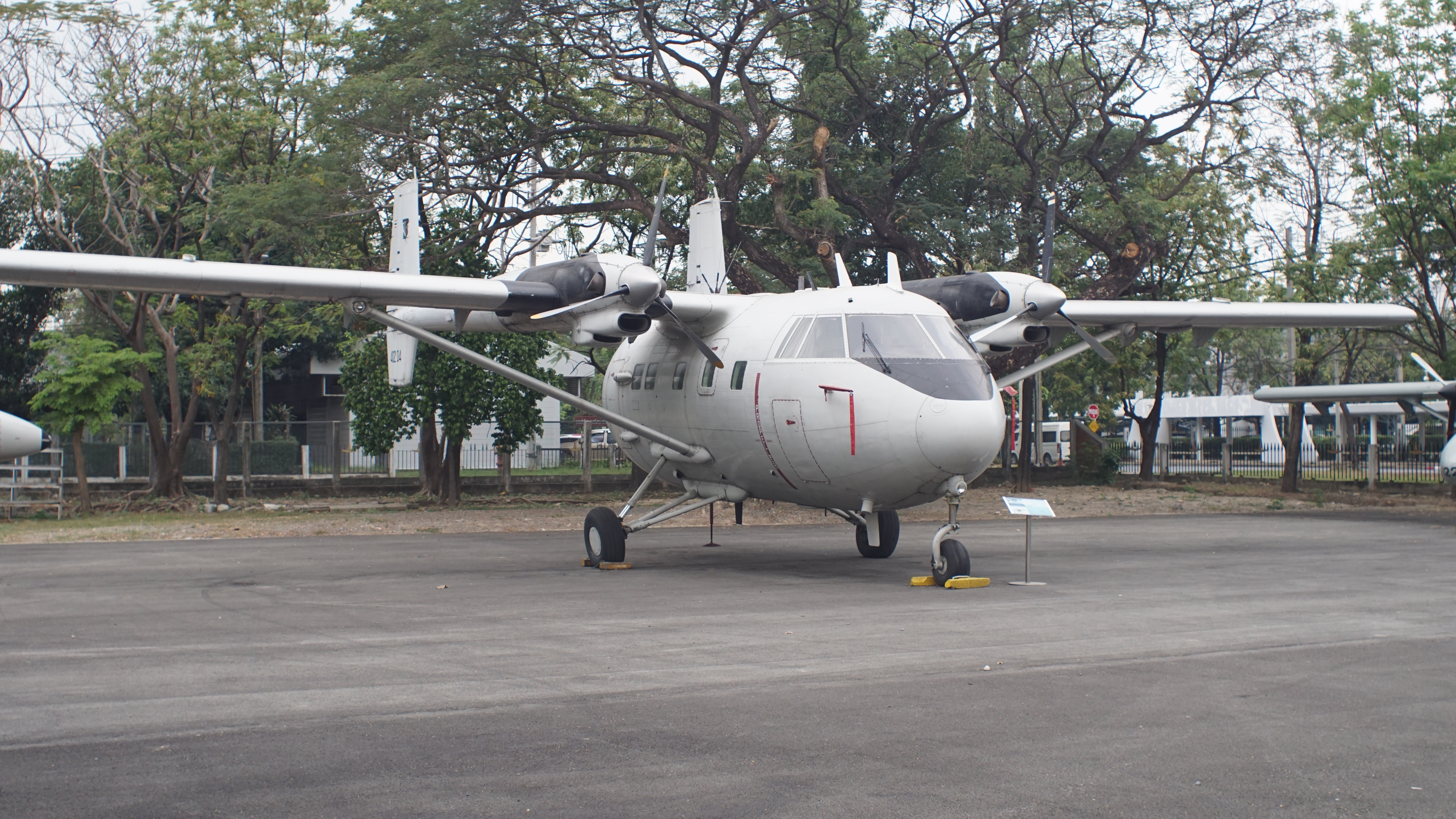
IAI Arava displayed at the Royal Thai Air Force Museum

Argentina

- Gobierno de Tierra Del Fuego – Dirección Provincial de Aeronáutica
- Provincia de Salta - Dirección Provincial de Aeronáutica (former operator)

Bolivia

- Bolivian Air Force – Six purchased 1975–76. One seized by Nicaragua during delivery, one in use 1987.

Cameroon

- Cameroon Air Force

Colombia

- Colombian Air Force – Former operator, last aircraft retired in September 2022.
  - Comando Aéreo de Combate No. 1

Ecuador

- Ecuadorian Army – 2 in use as of December 2018. One other aircraft E-206 was written off due to a crash
- Ecuadorian Navy – Former operator.

El Salvador

- Salvadoran Air Force – 3 in use as of December 2015, variant IAI Arava 202 since 2008.

Guatemala

- Guatemalan Air Force – 1 in use as of December 2015.

Haiti

- Haiti Air Corps

Honduras

- Honduran Air Force – 1 in use as of December 2018.

Israel

- Israeli Air Force

Liberia

- Armed Forces of Liberia

Mexico

- Mexican Air Force - Ordered 16 which were given the registrations "2001" to "2016." The first were ordered in 1973. In the 90s, they were re-registered "3001" to "3015." At least 2 were destroyed in incidents along their operative history and they are all currently retired. Some are scattered throughout the country on display. They had a role in Mexico's 1994 conflict between the Zapatista Army of National Liberation vs the Mexican Government, as they were used to bomb strategic positions and as aerial vigilance.

Nicaragua

- National Guard (Nicaragua)
- Nicaraguan Air Force

Papua New Guinea

- Papua New Guinea Defence Force – 3 in use as of December 2015 but since retired.

Eswatini

- Military of Swaziland

Thailand

- Royal Thai Air Force – 3 delivered from 1981. 3 remain in use as of December 2018.

Venezuela

- Army of Venezuela – 11 in use as of December 2015, reducing to 4 by December 2018.
- Venezuelan National Guard
- Venezuelan Navy – Former operator.

== Aircraft on display ==
Colombia

- "FAC 1952" - IAI Arava 201 (S/N:__) - Owned by the Colombian Air Force on display at the Colombian Aerospace Museum.

Guatemala

- "513" - IAI Arava 201 (S/N: 48) - Owned by the Guatemalan Air Force on display outside San Jose Airport in Guatemala.
- "872" - IAI Arava 201(S/N:__) - Owned by the Guatemalan Air Force on display outside Guatemala City La Aurora.

Honduras

- "FAH-317" - IAI Arava 201 (S/N: 34) - Owned by the Honduran Air Force at the Honduran Aviation Museum in Tegucigalpa Toncontin airport.

Israel

- "4X-JUB - 203" - IAI Arava 201 (S/N: 101) - Owned by the Israeli Air Force and on display at the I.A.F. Museum at the Beersheba Hatzerim Airport.

Mexico

- "2006" / "3006" - IAI Arava 102 (S/N: 36) - Owned by the Mexican Air Force and on display at the MUMA (Museo Militar de Aviación) - in Santa Lucia.
- "3015" - IAI Arava 201 (S/N: 53) - Owned by the Mexican Air Force and on Display Outside the Base Aérea Militar N.º 6 de Terán (Teran Air Force Base) in Tuxtla Gutierrez, Chiapas.
- "3014" - IAI Arava 201 (S/N: 52) - Owned by the Mexican Air Force on display near Toluca, at the 22a Military Zone.
- IAI Arava 201 on display at the Museo del Ejército y Fuerza Aérea, located in the Cuartel Colorado in Guadalajara, Jalisco.

Thailand "TL7-1/22" IAI Arava 201" (S/N: 56) - Owned by the Royal Thai Air Force at the Royal Thai Air Force Museum in Bangkok Don Muang Int'l Airport.

== Specifications (IAI 201) ==
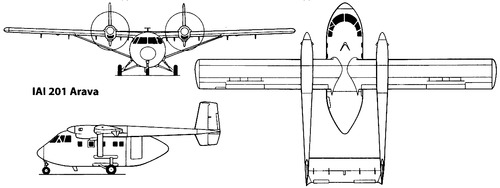
IAI Arava 201

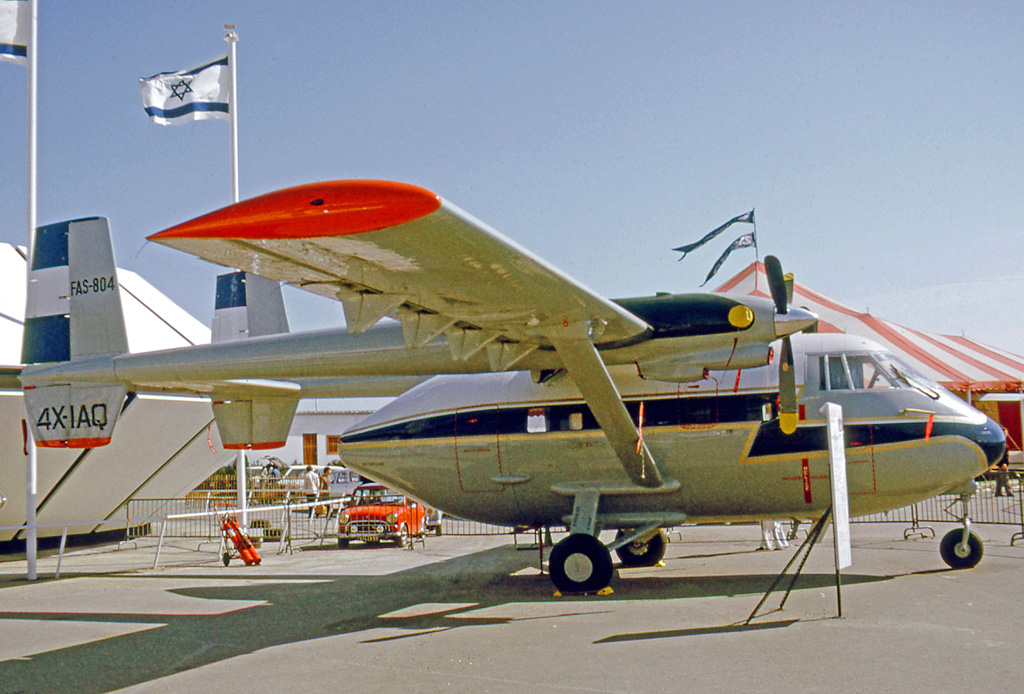
Arava 201 of the El Salvador Air Force displayed at the 1975 Paris Air Show prior to delivery

Data from Jane's All The World's Aircraft 1982–83.

General characteristics

- Crew: 2
- Capacity:
  - 24 fully equipped troops or
  - 16 paratroopers or
  - 2,351 kg (5,183 lb) payload
- Length: 13.03 m (42 ft 9 in)
- Wingspan: 20.96 m (68 ft 9 in)
- Height: 5.21 m (17 ft 1 in)
- Wing area: 43.68 m^{2} (470.2 sq ft)
- Aspect ratio: 10:1
- Airfoil: NACA 63(215)A 417
- Empty weight: 3,999 kg (8,816 lb)
- Max takeoff weight: 6,804 kg (15,000 lb)
- Fuel capacity: 1,663 L (439 US gal; 366 imp gal) (normal)
- Powerplant: 2 × Pratt & Whitney Canada PT6A-34 turboprops, 560 kW (750 shp) each
- Propellers: 3-bladed Hartzell HC-B3TN fully-feathering reversible pitch propellers

Performance

- Maximum speed: 326 km/h (203 mph, 176 kn) at 3,050 m (10,000 ft)
- Cruise speed: 311 km/h (193 mph, 168 kn) at 3,050 m (10,000 ft) (econ. cruise)
- Stall speed: 115 km/h (71 mph, 62 kn) (54% flaps)
- Never exceed speed: 397 km/h (247 mph, 214 kn)
- Range: 1,056 km (656 mi, 570 nmi) with maximum fuel
- Service ceiling: 7,620 m (25,000 ft)
- Rate of climb: 6.6 m/s (1,290 ft/min)
- Takeoff distance to 15 m (50 ft): 463 m (1,520 ft)
- Landing run from 15 m (50 ft): 469 m (1,540 ft)

== See also ==
Aircraft of comparable role, configuration, and era

- Antonov An-28
- CASA C-212 Aviocar
- de Havilland Canada DHC-6 Twin Otter
- Gotha Go 244
- Miles Aerovan
- Nord Noratlas
- PZL M28 Skytruck
- Short SC.7 Skyvan
