= Pastaza Canton =

- Canton
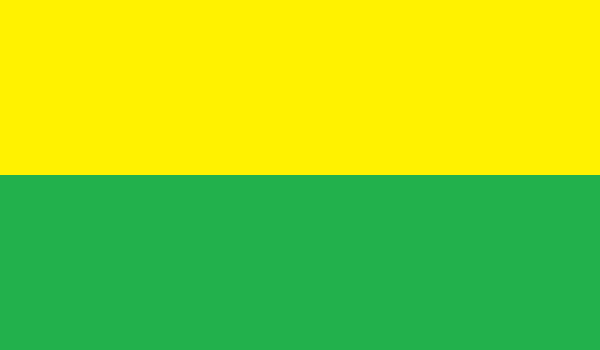
- Flag

- Location of Pastaza Province in Ecuador.

- Pastaza Canton in Pastaza Province
- Coordinates: 01°4′00″S 78°00′04″W
- Country: Ecuador
- Province: Pastaza Province
- Capital: Puyo

Area
  - Total: 19,855 km^{2} (7,666 sq mi)

Population (2022 census)
  - Total: 82,754
  - Density: 4.1679/km^{2} (10.795/sq mi)
- Time zone: UTC-5 (ECT)

Pastaza Canton is a canton of Ecuador, located in the Pastaza Province. Its capital is the town of Puyo. Its population at the 2001 census was 45,512.
