= Mera, Pastaza =

Mera
- Town
- Mera
- Nickname: Atalaya del Oriente (Orient Watchtower)
- Location within Ecuador
- Coordinates: 01°22′15″S 78°1′10″W
- Country: Ecuador
- Province: Pastaza Province
- Canton: Mera Canton
- Named for: Juan León Mera

Government
  - Type: Mayor and council
  - Governing body: Municipality of Mera
  - Mayor: Gustavo Silva

Area
  - Town: 1.37 km^{2} (0.53 sq mi)
- Elevation: 950 m (3,120 ft)

Population (2022 census)
  - Town: 853
  - Density: 623/km^{2} (1,610/sq mi)
- Demonym: Mereño(a)
- Time zone: UTC-5 (ECT)
- Area code: (0)4
- Climate: Af

Mera is a town in the eastern foothills of the Ecuadorian Andes. It is also the name of the Canton in Pastaza Province of which it is a part.

It lends its name to Shell Mera, a larger town 4 miles to the east.
