= Pastaza River =

River in the Amazon Basin of South America

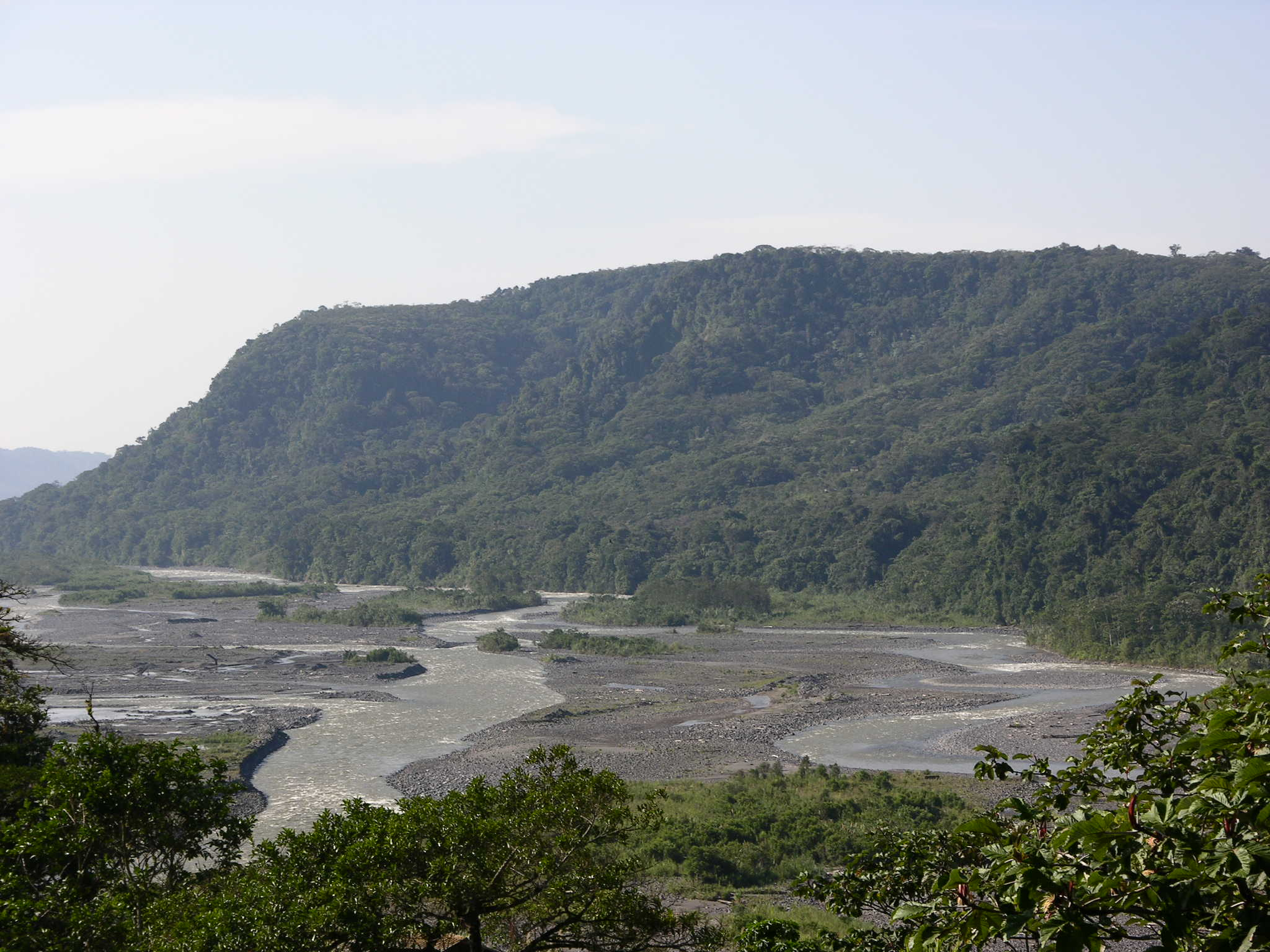
- The Pastaza at Mera, Pastaza Province

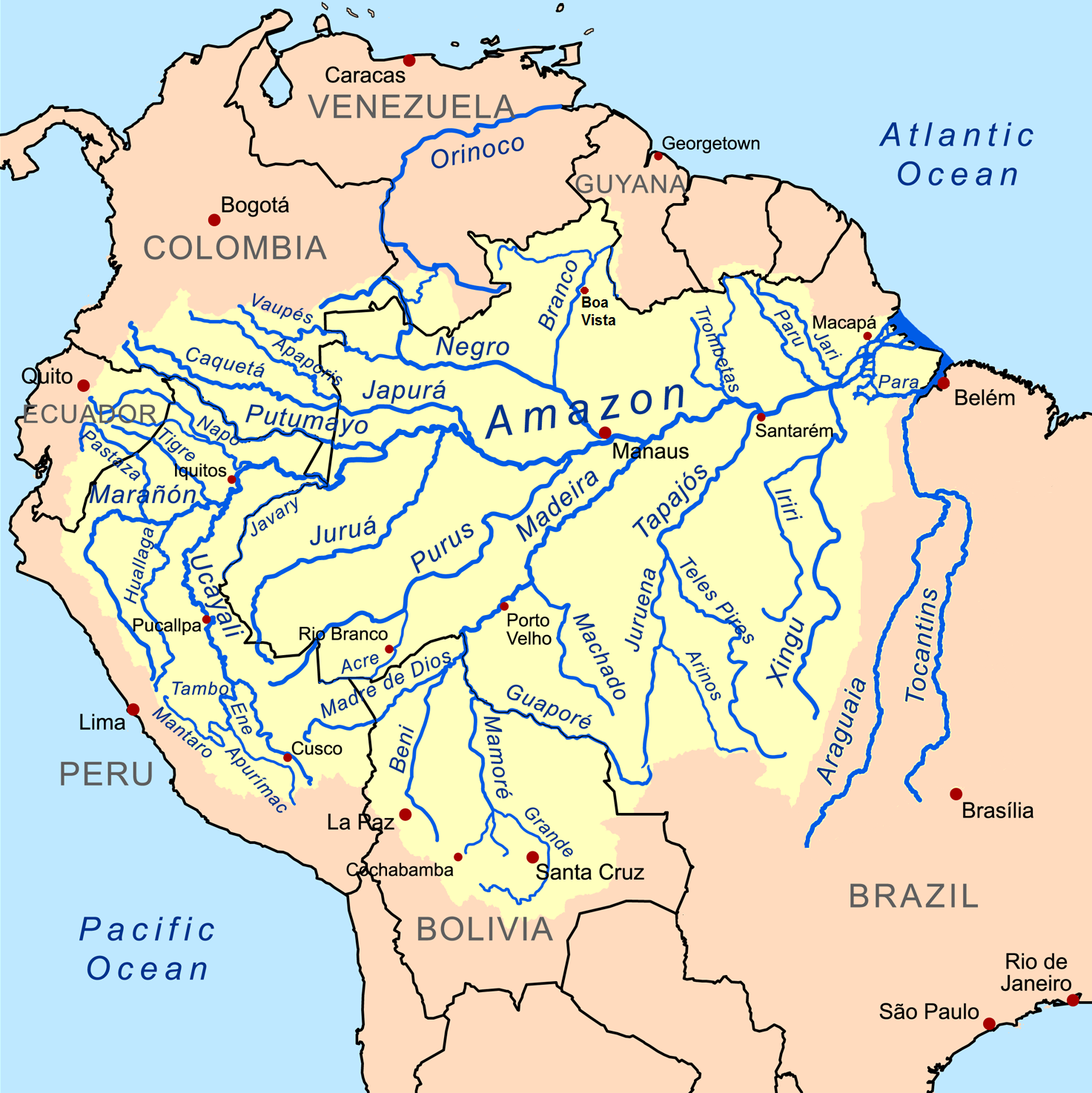
- Amazon Basin with Pastaza River in the far west
- Native name: Río Pastaza (Spanish)

Location
- Countries: Ecuador; Peru

Physical characteristics
- Source: Cotopaxi Province
  - coordinates: 0°40′0″S 78°27′0″W
  - elevation: 3,762 m (12,343 ft) 4,570 m (14,990 ft)
- Mouth: Marañón River
  - coordinates: 4°54′29″S 76°24′32″W
  - elevation: 125 m (410 ft) 120 m (390 ft)
- Length: 786.41 km (488.65 mi) 710 km (440 mi)
- Basin size: 39,504 km^{2} (15,253 mi^{2}) 41,793 km^{2} (16,136 mi^{2})
- Discharge
  - location: Confluence of Marañón (near mouth)
  - average: (Period: 1965–2013)2,438.23 m^{3}/s (86,105 cu ft/s) 2,769 m^{3}/s (97,800 cu ft/s)

Basin features
- Progression: Marañón → Amazon → Atlantic Ocean
- River system: Amazon

Ramsar Wetland
- Official name: Complejo de humedales del Abanico del río Pastaza
- Designated: 5 June 2002
- Reference no.: 1174

The Pastaza River (Spanish: Río Pastaza, formerly known as the Sumatara) also known as the Patate, flowing in Ecuador and Peru is a large tributary to the Marañón River in the northwestern Amazon Basin of South America.

It has its headwaters in the Ecuadorian province of Cotopaxi, flowing off the northwestern slopes of the volcano Cotopaxi and known as the Patate River. The Patate flows south and in Tungurahua Province it is joined by the Chambo River just upstream from the town of Baños de Agua Santa just north of the volcano Mount Tungurahua and becomes the Pastaza. Seven kilometers east of Baños, it is dammed for the Agoyán hydroelectric project, which has created a silty lagoon by the village of La Cieniga. The Agoyán dam was placed in that location specifically to leave the famous Falls of Agoyán, about 5 km further downstream, intact. After the waterfall the river enters a gorge where there is very fast whitewater with class-4 rapids; it is often used for whitewater rafting although it is not considered to be of the same quality as the Tena River and is therefore less popular for the sport.

From the junction with the Chambo, the Pastaza flows almost due east for about 275 kilometres (171 mi) where it then turns south-east, as it is joined by the Topo River. The Troncal Amazonas highway parallels the river from Baños to Puyo, passing through seven tunnels, and four major waterfalls that are touristic destinations for many Ecuadorians (Agoyán and Pailón del Diablo being the most popular.) Just past the town of Santa Inez, the Pastaza River crosses into the province of Pastaza, where it forms the boundary between that province and Morona-Santiago. At the town of Mera, shortly before reaching Puyo, the river exits the mountains and flows into a wide valley, becoming wider and shallower. After Shell the river becomes braided and meanders, leaving oxbows and sloughs along its route across the Amazonian floodplain.

After cutting through Ecuador, the Pastaza passes into Peru at the village of Hito Zoilaluz on Isla Zoilaluz and flows south into the Marañón River near Puerto Industrial.

== Tributaries ==
The Pastaza has numerous tributaries, both above and below the hydroelectric dam. These contribute to its rapid flow and to its tendency to flood. On the highway side of the Pastaza, a tributary river occurs about every 3–4 km for a stretch of about 50 km; on the opposite bank, the number of tributaries is slightly lower. The major tributaries are the Chambo, Bobonaza, and Huasaga, also important are the Ambato, the Pindo, and the Puyo.

== Economy ==
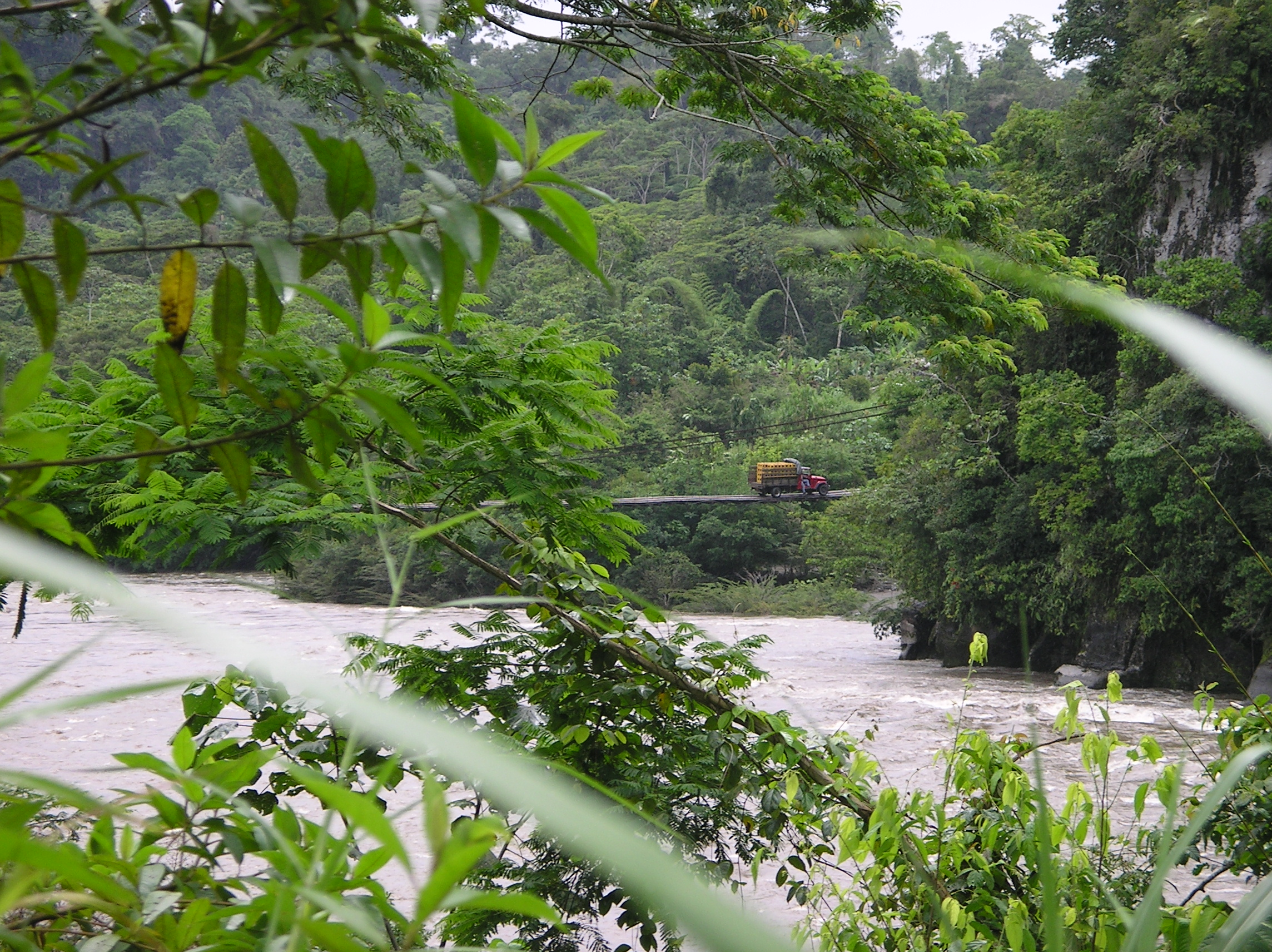
Bridge over the Pastaza River between Puyo and Macas

There are no major fisheries on the Pastaza River - it is primarily used as a means of transport by canoe. Its rise and fall are rapid and uncertain, and it is shallow and full of sandbanks and snags. Flooding occurs seasonally.

== Bridges ==
In Ecuador, there are very few bridges across the Pastaza. The most significant ones are in Tungurahua province - namely a large span over the exact point of headwaters, just north of Baños, and the secondary span created by the Agoyán dam. After this, bridges tend to be of the suspension type, suitable for foot or small vehicle passage only. However, it is notable that the Pastaza can be forded during the dry season in a 4x4 truck, going across the floodplains below the town of Mera.

== See also ==
- Agoyán
