= Sarayaku =

Village of Ecuador

Coordinates: 1°44′S 77°29′W

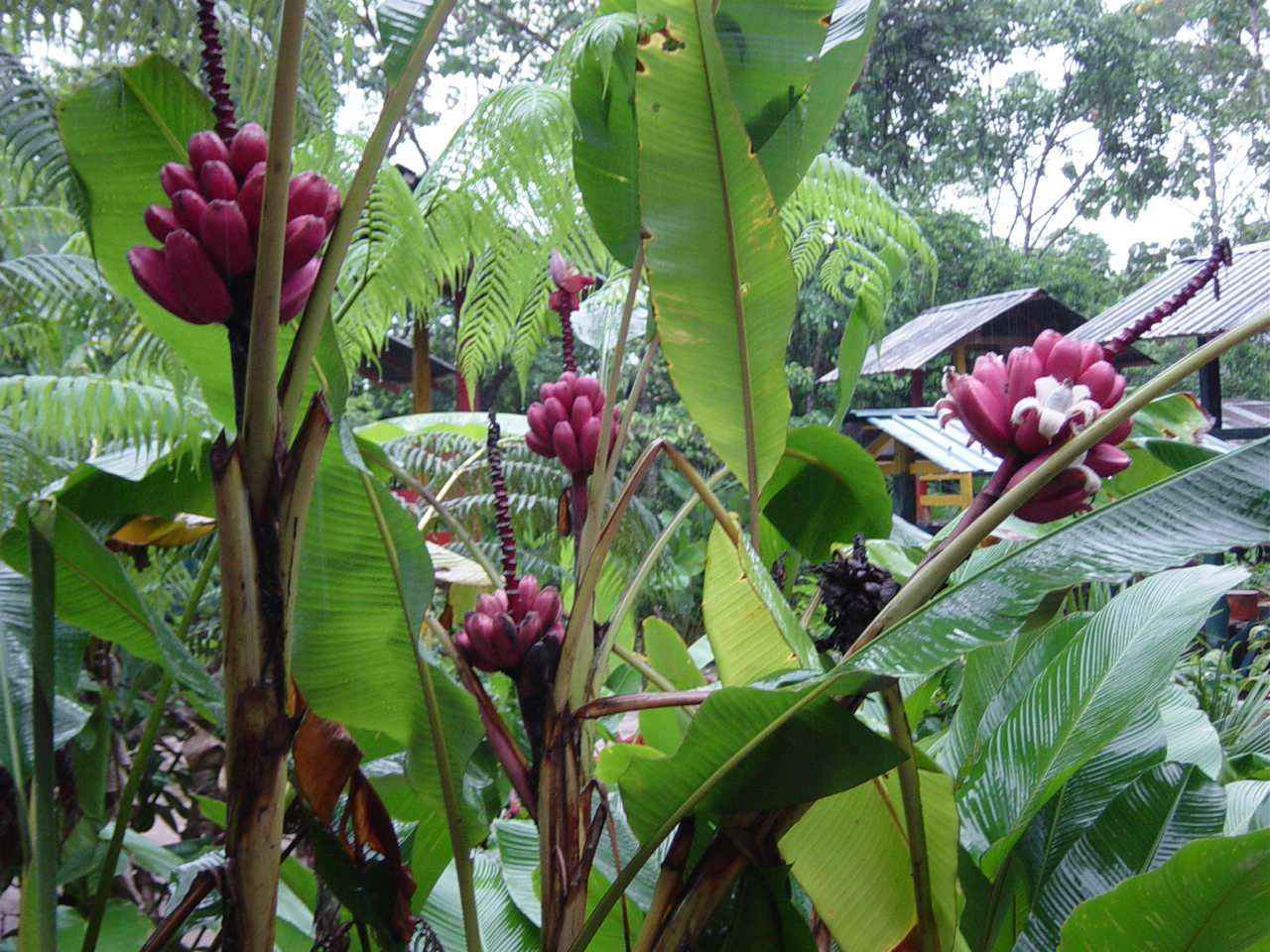
Banana blossoms in Puyo. (Photo: Martin Zeise, Berlin)

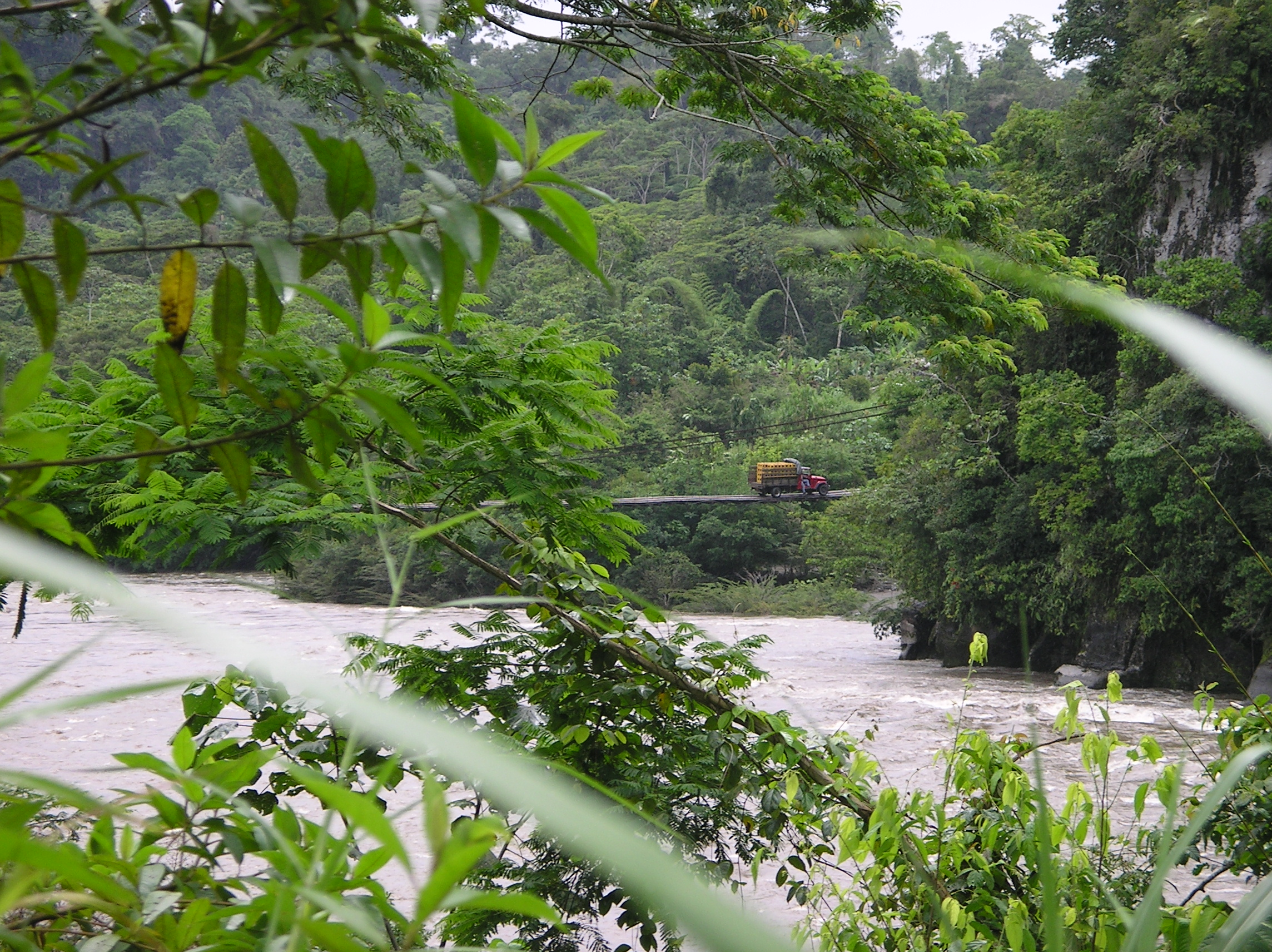
Bridge over the river Pastazas between Puyo and Macas. (Photo: André Hübner)

Sarayaku (Quechuan: "The River of Corn"; also transcribed Sarayacu) is a territory and a village situated by the Bobonaza River in the province of Pastaza in the southern part of el Oriente, the Amazonic region of Ecuador. The territory incorporates a number of villages.

It has a total population figure of between 1,000 and 2,000 Kichwa-speaking people, who call themselves the Runa people of Sarayaku, or the Sarayaku people. The leader of the Sarayaku people is Tupak Viteri (2022).

Since the early 21st century, the Sarayaku have engaged in a decade-long effort to resist efforts to drill for oil in their community, putting them at cross purposes with the Ecuadorian government and various multinational oil companies. The Sarayaku have used protests and legal challenges, successfully pursuing a suit in court.

== Ecotourism ==
The village of Sarayaku is situated in tropical rainforest; it is approximately 25 minutes by plane or one day by canoe in the southeast direction from the nearest city, Puyo. Puyo is 50 kilometres east of the better known city of Baños. The Bobonaza River drains into the Amazon River at Iquitos in Peru, via the Pastaza and the Marañón rivers.

Since the late 20th century, the Sarayaku people have emphasized ecotourism as a means to make a sustainable living while preserving their culture and lands. They work to preserve the distinctive character and ecology of their delicate rainforest.

In the fall of 2003, university studies were established in Sarayaku. The program was developed through the cooperation of the universities of Cuenca, Ecuador, and Lleida, Spain. The main goal of the university program is to raise the quality of multicultural and multilingual education among the indigenous communities in the province of Pastaza. The people will be able to develop their own educational resources and have an opportunity to learn at the university level about cultural identity and cultural traditions, other philosophies, and the Indian cosmo vision.

== Conflict with government and multi-national petroleum companies ==
In the early 21st century, the Argentine oil company CGC moved into Sarayaku territory to conduct seismic surveys in search of petroleum. The Ecuadorian government has been eager to develop new resources, as the state economy is highly dependent on income from crude oil export to pay national debt. Neither the government nor the company had consulted with the indigenous community before starting these activities.

The Sarayaku protested and resisted CGC activities, as they believed that petroleum development would threaten the fragile nature of the Amazonian rainforest and their subsistence society. To stop the resistance, the government sent federal soldiers to Sarayaku and closed the Bobonaza River as traffic artery.

The Sarayaku people have accused the oil companies of ethnocide, as they believe oil development would destroy their subsistence economy and the unique rainforest habitat of their territory. Oil development can adversely affect the cultural, nutritional, ecological, and spiritual resources on this place. The Sarayaku believe it will undermine the social balance in the community. They claim that the oil industry is also the biggest threat to the recently founded university program in Sarayaku.

Among the activist leaders is Franco Viteri, former president of the Confederation of Indigenous Nationalities of the Ecuadorian Amazon (CONFENIAE). Made up of peoples of the Amazon Basin in Ecuador, this group "has been involved in nationwide protests for more than 30 years."

The Sarayaku filed suit against the government in the Inter-American Court of Human Rights, based in Costa Rica, saying it had failed to consult fully with the indigenous community before undertaking disruptive activities on their lands and threatening their environment. In 2011, Sarayaku activists and their attorneys traveled to Costa Rica to appear in court, when some had never been to the capital of Ecuador. The court directed "the [Ecuadorian] government to abide by international law and consult with the community regarding any project."

== Representation in other media ==
- The Kichwa de Sarayaku Indigenous community, in cooperation with Amnesty International, co-produced a documentary titled Children of the Jaguar (2012). Directed by Eriberto Benedicto Gualinga Montalvo, the film tells the story of a Sarayaku 2011 victory in the Court of Human Rights in Costa Rica. The court ruled that the Ecuadorian government had to abide by international law and consult with the Sarayaku regarding any projects in their territory.

Released at film festivals, Children of the Jaguar was awarded "Best Documentary" by the All Roads Film Project of the National Geographic Society. The film also received Colombia's Indigenous Festival prize for best depiction of a struggle by an indigenous people. In December 2012, Eriberto Gualinga received the Award for International Recognition, by Ecuador's Ministry of Culture for his film.

In 2003, two French friends made a documentary about the story of oil exploitation in Ecuador.
