= Shell, Ecuador =

Shell
- town
- A view of Shell from the GMU campus

- Location within Ecuador
- Coordinates: 01°30′19″S 78°3′46″W
- Country: Ecuador
- Province: Pastaza
- Canton: Mera
- Elevation: 1,067 m (3,501 ft)
- Time zone: UTC−5 (EST)
- Climate: Af

Shell (also Shell Mera) is a city located on the western edge of the Ecuadorian Amazon and in the eastern foothills of the Andes. It is located about 94 miles (151 km) southeast of Quito, and roughly 4 miles (6.4 km) west of the provincial capital, Puyo. Its name comes from the Royal Dutch Shell corporation.

== Shell Oil base ==
Shell Mera was established in 1937 as a Shell Oil Company base. The base consisted of little more than several basic shacks and a 5,000-foot (1,500 m) airstrip. It was operated as part of Shell's prospecting efforts in the region. The base was located near some Indian tribes who strongly opposed the exploitation of resources found in their ancestral territories. The Indians attacked Shell several times, resulting in the deaths of several employees. The oil company abandoned the base in 1948. However, it is more likely that business prospects had more to do with the decision. It was during this time that the Middle East rose in prominence in the oil industry, since it was becoming much more productive. After ten years of prospecting in Ecuador, the oil company had not produced any oil from the region.

== Missionary base ==
Sometime around 1949, Shell was reoccupied by Mission Aviation Fellowship. MAF recognized the importance of Shell due to its airstrip and road access to Quito. They used it as their main base of operations for mission work in Ecuador, and it was also the home base of MAF pilots Nate Saint and Johnny Keenan.

In 1954 Saint, a former member of the U.S. Army, welcomed General James Doolittle to Shell. Doolittle was an Army Air Forces aviator who rose to fame during what became known as "Doolittle's Raid" over Tokyo in 1942. General Doolittle was visiting Ecuador for then-President Eisenhower on a fact-finding mission for the CIA.

World-wide attention focused on Shell in January 1956 at the news of the disappearance of Saint and four other missionaries – Jim Elliot, Pete Fleming, Ed McCully, and Roger Youderian. They had been trying to reach the Huaorani tribe, and had been making aerial reconnaissance missions. When they landed in Huaorani territory they were killed by the natives, their bodies thrown into the Curaray River. Once again, Shell served as a base of operations, this time for the families of the victims and rescue workers.

Two years later, in 1958, the Hospital Vozandes Del Oriente opened its doors as the first hospital in that region of Ecuador. The hospital was the dream of Nate Saint, who donated both land and time to work on its construction before his death in 1956. It served an estimated 65,000 people who lived on the eastern side of the Andes and in the jungle. In 1985 a new Hospital Vozandes was opened on the other side of the Motolo River, and the old hospital was converted to a guest house, lasting until 2007 when weather and termites forced it to be torn down. The new Hospital Vozandes Del Oriente was closed at the end of 2013, after 55 years of service in Pastaza.

In August 1964, Nate Saint Memorial School opened in Shell for missionary children. The school was founded by Charlotte Dillon Swanson, wife of Wallace Swanson, a missionary physician at the HCJB Hospital Voz Andes. She began by teaching her own children at home in 1962 and later expanded the school to include other missionary children. After she raised money for a building she named the school in memory of Nate Saint.

== Today ==
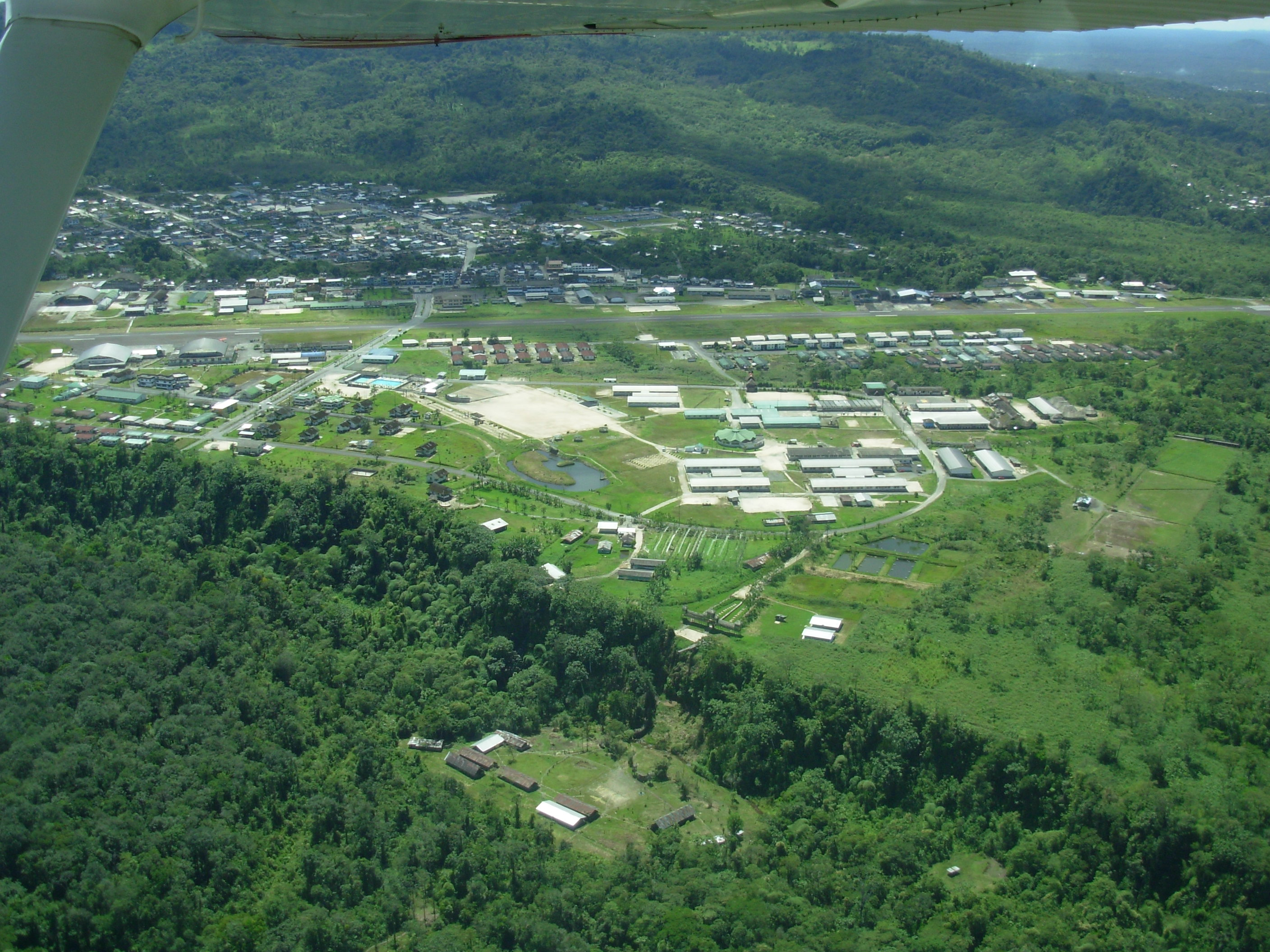
Aerial view of Río Amazonas Airport in Shell

Today, Shell is a town of around 10,000 people, with many business enterprises, schools, churches, hotels and restaurants, and a hospital. There is also a large military base (El Fuerte Militar Amazonas), which serves as headquarters for the 17th Jungle Brigade, as well as EWIAS (Escuela de Iwias Crnl. Gonzalo Barragán) jungle warfare school.

The airstrip remains operational and continues to serve the region as the Río Amazonas Airport (PTZ), which is owned by the military and used as a base. The airport is also still a major base of operations for the MAF.

== General sources ==
- Elliot, Elisabeth, Through Gates of Splendor.
- Elliot, Philip James, Papers (archives), Billy Graham Center, Collection 277.
- Hoffman, David (May 27, 2003), Shell-Mera, The Hoffman family.
- Wishall, Garrett E. Experiencing the culture firsthand (Feb. 23, 2006)
- Time Magazine article (Mar. 31, 1947)
- Rachel Saint History, The Akha Heritage Foundation, Feb 2006.
- Nate Saint Memorial School, HCJB.
