= Puyo, Pastaza =

Puyo
- City
- Nuestra Señora del Rosario de Pompeya de Puyo
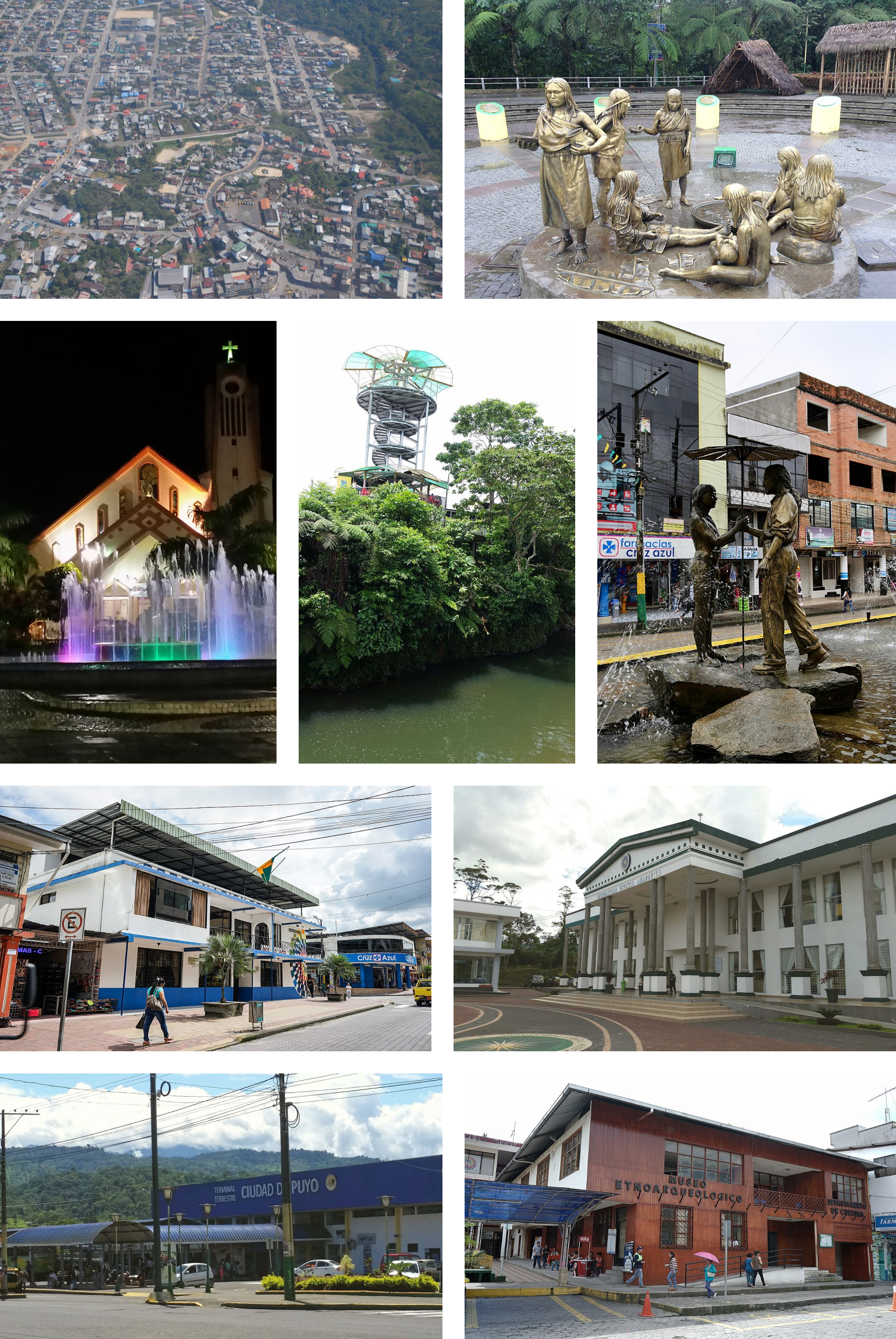
- From top, left to right: Aerial view of the city, monument to the indigenous groups of Pastaza, Our Lady of the Rosary Cathedral, viewpoint next to the Puyo River, monument to the Indian-mestizo Forge, Pastaza Governorate, Amazon State University, Puyo Bus Station and Ethno-archaeological Museum.

- Location within Ecuador
- Coordinates: 01°29′10″S 78°00′10″W
- Country: Ecuador
- Province: Pastaza
- Canton: Pastaza Canton
- Foundation: November 10, 1899
- Founder: Unnamed Catholic priest
- Named for: Puyu, meaning "clouds" in Quichua

Government
  - Type: Mayor and council
  - Governing body: Municipality of Puyo
  - Mayor: German Flores Meza
  - City council: List of council members: Maritza Elizabeth Campos Naula; Wilson Heriberto Cañadas Sevilla; Jorge Bladimir Ilbay Escobar; Henry Fabian Palacios Fernandez; Dayanne Marylin Poveda Flores; Jimena Carolina Teran Sierra; Raul Efren Valverde Gallardo

Area
  - City: 8.49 km^{2} (3.28 sq mi)
- Elevation: 950 m (3,120 ft)

Population (2022 census)
  - City: 33,325
  - Density: 3,930/km^{2} (10,200/sq mi)
  - Demonym: Puyense
- Time zone: UTC-5 (ECT)
- Postal code: EC160150
- Area code: (+593) 4
- Climate: Af
- Website: www.puyo.gob.ec (in Spanish)

Puyo (Spanish pronunciation: [ˈpuʝo]), also known as El Puyo, is the capital of Pastaza, a province in Ecuador. Puyo is located at an altitude of approximately 950 metres above sea level by the Puyo River, a tributary of the Pastaza River, which eventually leads into the Amazon River. True to its name, derived from the Kichwa word for "cloudy", the local climate is a wet one and the weather is often overcast.

Puyo was founded in 1899. Located between Baños, and the Amazonian cities of Tena and Macas, Puyo is the commercial, cultural and political capital of the region. In late 2006, the city had approximately 25,000 inhabitants. It was the fastest growing city in Ecuador in 2006. The seasonal changes in the climate are relatively small, and daytime temperature typically range between 18 and 24 °C, with sun and generally short, but heavy periods of rain daily.

== History ==
The main street of Puyo, c. 1900

At the beginning of the nineteenth century the Canelos region was integrated into the territory of the township of Ambato, a jurisdiction established in 1797 within the Presidency of Quito, which at that time was part of the Viceroyalty of New Granada. In 1802 King Carlos IV of Spain issued the decree of erection of the Bishopric of Mainas that should also include the Canelos Mission. This Decree, which was only ecclesiastical in character, was, however, to have unfortunate consequences in subsequent border disputes with Peru. On 23 June 1824 the Senate and House of Representatives of the Republic of Colombia issued a Law on Territorial Division which organized the territory of the Gran Colombia in twelve departments. Each department comprised provinces and cantons. The area belonged to the canton Pastaza Macas of the Province of Chimborazo in Ecuador called Department No. 10.

During these years the Ecuadorian "East" (Oriente) was abandoned by the central powers; the presence of missionaries decreased even stopped several times, traders transited rather sporadically, exploiters of gold and Spices of the region, especially furs, latex and cinnamon. On May 29, 1861, and in the independent Ecuador, the National Convention issued the First Law on Territorial Division that distributed the country in fifteen provinces, one of them, "East". From then the Amazon territories were identified by that name. However, many Amazonian jurisdictions were still attached to the provinces of the Sierra.

The cantons of Coast and Sierra were made up of parishes; those in the East were built also by peoples and territories. Oriente Province consisted of the Napo and Canelos cantons. The Canelos canton included the towns of Canelos, Sarayaku, Lliquino, Andoas and Sapara and Jivaro tribes who formed the missions of Canelos. During the first government of Gabriel García Moreno in 1869, the Vicariate of the Eastern Missions was created and entrusted to the Jesuits. In 1886, during the government of Caamaño, the Vicariate was divided into four apostolic prefectures, Canelos and Macas being entrusted to the Dominicans. We must consider that the Government of Ecuador invested missionaries with full political and civil authority at that time, an example being Rvdo. Pedro Guerrero and Sosa, who came to Canelos in April 1887, and as well as missionary had the position of Political Head of the canton.

On March 27, 1897, by an Act of the National Assembly, signed by President Eloy Alfaro on 14 April of the same year, the "Region East" was created and with this background the same Eloy Alfaro in 1899, dictates "Special Act East", giving the region, preferential treatment; but as in the previous law, several Amazonian territories continued belonging to Sierra provinces. At this time the Canelos canton happened to belong to the province of Tungurahua. As is noted in the preceding paragraphs, that the origin of what is now Pastaza, born in Canelos, also refers to a village called Infidels Pastaza that existed since 1775. Canelos rather, over time, was losing its identity with the Canton and Province in the mists of the "Legend of the Land of Cinnamon"; there is even talk that in Canelos, before the Foundation of Father Sebastian Rosero in 1624, there was an "old town" called MAUKALLAKTA. From here, the area gradually was taking shape and consolidating as a geographical and administrative space, and when the Pastaza canton was established on November 13, 1911, Canelos unfortunately, was reduced to just a rural parish in the Pastaza canton.

The current city of Puyo was founded on 12 May 1899 by the Dominican missionary Alvaro Valladares and nine indigenous Canelos: Captain Eustaquio Palate or Illanes, Ignacio Vargas, Sebastian Illanes, Toribio Santi, and others; who, while looking for a place to stop and rest between Baños and Canelos, found the right place near the Rio Puyo, where today is Central Park.

The missionaries built 3 large huts in that place, there they put a wooden cross and celebrated a Mass, entrusting the people to the Virgin Mary, who was dedicated as Our Lady of the Rosary of Pompeii, Puyo.

During the first few years, the new village was inhabited by native Indians. Mestizos traders used it as a break on their journeys between Baños and Canelos.

== Geography ==
=== Climate ===
Puyo experiences an equatorial tropical rainforest climate ((Köppen Af) that is dominated by the Intertropical Convergence Zone and with no cyclones. Heavy rain falls throughout the year. Due to its high elevation (960 metres or 3,150 feet), Puyo experiences noticeably cooler temperatures than other areas with this type of climate at lower elevations. The average temperature in Puyo is 21.1 °C or 70.0 °F, and annual rainfall averages 4,603.8 millimetres or 181.3 inches.

Climate data for Puyo, elevation 956 m (3,136 ft), (1984–2013)
Month	Jan	Feb	Mar	Apr	May	Jun	Jul	Aug	Sep	Oct	Nov	Dec	Year
Mean daily maximum °C (°F)	26.4 (79.5)	26.2 (79.2)	26.4 (79.5)	26.7 (80.1)	26.2 (79.2)	25.6 (78.1)	25.4 (77.7)	26.6 (79.9)	27.3 (81.1)	27.7 (81.9)	27.4 (81.3)	26.7 (80.1)	26.6 (79.8)
Daily mean °C (°F)	21.2 (70.2)	21.2 (70.2)	21.3 (70.3)	21.4 (70.5)	21.1 (70.0)	20.6 (69.1)	20.2 (68.4)	20.7 (69.3)	21.1 (70.0)	21.6 (70.9)	21.7 (71.1)	21.4 (70.5)	21.1 (70.0)
Mean daily minimum °C (°F)	17.6 (63.7)	17.6 (63.7)	17.7 (63.9)	17.8 (64.0)	17.7 (63.9)	17.3 (63.1)	16.5 (61.7)	16.2 (61.2)	16.4 (61.5)	17.1 (62.8)	17.6 (63.7)	17.6 (63.7)	17.3 (63.1)
Average rainfall mm (inches)	325.5 (12.81)	341.0 (13.43)	371.2 (14.61)	492.2 (19.38)	476.8 (18.77)	462.5 (18.21)	360.7 (14.20)	296.2 (11.66)	330.5 (13.01)	398.9 (15.70)	377.2 (14.85)	371.1 (14.61)	4,603.8 (181.24)
Average relative humidity (%)	89.8	89.8	90.0	90.3	90.4	90.5	89.2	86.9	87.0	87.7	89.0	89.8	89.2
Source 1: Instituto Nacional de Meteorología e Hidrología
Source 2: NOAA (precipitation and humidity 1981-2010

== Transportation ==
The city is connected by road to Ambato, Tena, and Macas and from there to the major urban areas of Ecuador.

A small airport is located in the small town of Shell, approximately 10 kilometres (6.2 mi) north-west of Puyo. Small aircraft, both private and commercial, depart daily to small airstrips in the Amazon rainforest, and occasionally to Quito in the case of severe medical emergencies.

== Culture ==
The Puyo Carnaval, a famous Ecuadorian holiday, is celebrated each year in the days leading up to Lent. The custom is to have small neighbourhood parties, and water fights are sometimes involved. Other major holidays are the Day of the Ecuadorian East Amazon on February 12, and the chonta-palm festival.
