= Pastaza Province =

Province of Ecuador

Pastaza
- Province
- Province of Pastaza
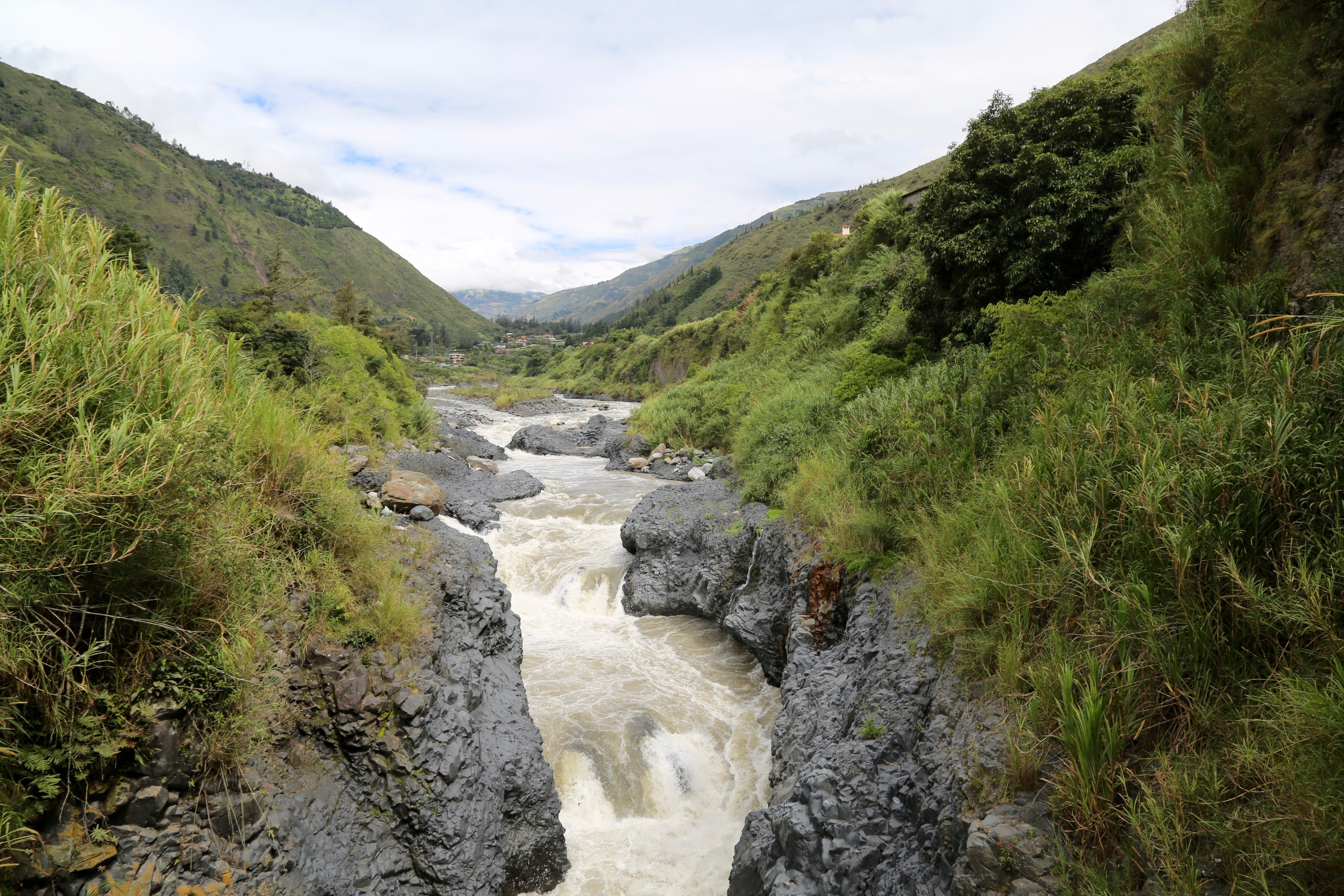
- Pastaza River

- Flag Seal
- Motto: Construyendo desarrollo
- Pastaza Province in Ecuador

- Cantons of Pastaza Province
- Coordinates: 01°4′00″S 78°00′04″W
- Country: Ecuador
- Pastaza: November 10, 1959
- Founder: Government of Ecuador
- Named for: The Pastaza River
- Capital: Puyo

Government
  - Prefect: André Granda (ADN)
  - Governor: Rolando Ramos

Area
  - Total: 29,514 km^{2} (11,395 sq mi)

Population (2022 census)
  - Total: 111,915
  - Density: 3.7919/km^{2} (9.8211/sq mi)
- Time zone: UTC-5 (ECT)
- Vehicle registration: S
- HDI (2017): 0.724 high · 14th
- Website: www.pastaza.gob.ec

Pastaza (Spanish pronunciation: [pasˈtasa]) is a province in the Oriente of Ecuador located in the eastern jungle. The capital is Puyo, founded on May 12, 1899, with a population of 33,325. The city is now accessible by paved roads, a recent development; the main road from Baños follows the Pastaza river into the province.

The Pastaza River surges into the province from the west and as the landscape flattens, meanders on to the Napo, a tributary of the Amazon. Natural resources of Pastaza are bananas, grapefruit, tobacco, cocoa and coffee. Tea has successfully been cultivated by a few British companies, and in the mid-1980s one of the companies was honored by a visit from Princess Margaret from the royal family of Britain.

The landscape is mostly mountainous in the western part of the province and becomes relatively flat toward the east as it nears the Peruvian border with rivers and plains characterizing most of the province. The highest elevation is 1,820 meters (5,970 ft). The climate is warm and humid due to the almost 7 meters of annual rainfall (22 ft) in the parts closest to the western mountains, but with significant amounts of rainfall throughout the province. The median temperature is 18 to 24 Celsius. It is rumored that there is much gold in the rivers of Pastaza; however, to date no significant discoveries of gold have been reported.

Snakes and other venomous creatures, such as tarantulas and scorpions, are common in the province. Travellers are advised to be cautious in any trekking through the jungles, parks and trails. Some of the snakes blend extremely well even in trees, so walking sticks and/or machetes are a good precaution for hiking.

The flora of the region is spectacular. A few local parks have been developed with myriad natural orchids from the area and admittance to these parks is relatively inexpensive. Rainy day gear is advised since the rains are present almost year-round, many times in the late afternoon, but occasional all day as well. The rain is quite warm compared to those in North America.

Pastaza is the largest province in Ecuador and the richest in biodiversity. To the north of Pastaza are the provinces Napo and Orellana, to the south is Morona Santiago, to the east is the country of Peru, and to the west are the provinces Tungurahua and Morona Santiago. The total population is about 83,930 inhabitants.

== Demographics ==
Ethnic groups as of the Ecuadorian census of 2010:

- Mestizo 55.3%
- Indigenous 39.8%
- White 2.9%
- Afro-Ecuadorian 1.5%
- Montubio 0.4%
- Other 0.2%

== Cantons ==
The province is divided into four cantons. The following table lists each with its population at the 2001 census, its area in square kilometres (km^{2}), and the name of the canton seat or capital.

Canton	Pop. (2001)	Area (km^{2})	Seat/Capital
Arajuno	5,150	8,767	Arajuno
Mera	8,088	520	Mera
Pastaza	45,512	19,727	Puyo
Santa Clara	3,029	311	Santa Clara

== List of places in Pastaza Province ==
- Arajuno
- Mashient
- Mera
- Puyo
- Sarayaku
- Shell Mera

== See also ==
- Provinces of Ecuador
- Cantons of Ecuador
