= Bridge of Blood =

Play

- A Footstool Players poster advertises a 2003 production of Bridge of Blood.
- Original language: English
- Written by: David H. Robey
- Characters: Elisabeth Elliot; Jim Elliot; Pete Fleming; Ed McCully; Nate Saint; Roger Youderian
- Subject: Christian missions Martyrdom
- Genre: Readers' Theatre
- Setting: Ecuador, 1956

Premiere
- Date: 1988
- Place: United States

Bridge of Blood: Jim Elliot Takes Christ to the Aucas is a 1973 readers' theatre play based on the story of Operation Auca. It was written by David Robey, a former drama professor at Cedarville University, and produced by Lillenas Drama in 1988.

Bridge of Blood is based on Through Gates of Splendor and Shadow of the Almighty, two books written by Elisabeth Elliot. Consequently, the character of Elisabeth in the play is also the narrator. All of the characters' monologues were taken directly from their own letters, diaries and journals.

The play was originally published in the 1988 book Two for Missions, which also included For This Cause, a drama about John and Betty Stam. In December 1996, the play was republished in the book Three with a Mission, which added to the original two plays, The World Is My Parish, a drama about John Wesley. The 1996 version of the play added an introductory scene.

== Synopsis ==
The first act of the play focuses on the background of the five missionaries, especially Jim Elliot and Nate Saint. All the men and their wives eventually move to Ecuador as missionaries, and as the act is about to close, Saint discovers the "Aucas" from his plane. This leads the men to begin making plans for Operation Auca.

The second act describes the efforts of Operation Auca itself. The men make aerial gift drops to the Aucas and learn helpful Auca phrases. The play then focuses for some time on the night of January 2, 1956, the day before the men left for Auca territory. As they are busy making preparations, Pete comforts Olive who is worried about the safety of the expedition. All the missionaries then have prayer together and sing "We Rest on Thee". The men are killed five days later by the Aucas, and the play ends with Elisabeth telling about the eventual redemption of the Auca tribe through continued missionary efforts.

== Cast ==
The cast includes 10 members – 5 men and 5 women. The main characters also double as minor characters during certain scenes, creating a virtual cast of 18.

(The 1996 publication added the "Host", an MC or the director of the play, who is not part of the cast, who only reads an introductory monologue after the first scene.)

Main Characters:

- Jim Elliot
- Elisabeth Elliot
- Pete Fleming (student)
- Olive Fleming (Miriam Shuell)
- Ed McCully (Wayne and Albert Shuell)
- Marilou McCully (Dayuma)
- Nate Saint (Bob)
- Marj Saint (Mrs. Shuell)
- Roger Youderian (Preacher)
- Barbara Youderian

Minor Characters:

- Wayne, Jim's high school friend
- Bob, Jim's high school's student body president
- an unnamed Wheaton College student
- Preacher, the pastor of the Shuells' church (also the leader of the Christian club)
- Albert Shuell
- Mrs. Shuell, his wife
- Miriam Shuell, their daughter and friend of Nate Saint
- Dayuma
