= Avant Ministries =

Christian Missionaries

Avant Ministries (formerly known as Gospel Missionary Union) is a non-profit, Christian mission agency focused on planting and developing churches worldwide. Headquartered in Kansas City, Missouri, and Winnipeg, Manitoba, Avant missionaries serve in church planting and church support ministries in Africa, Asia, Europe and North and South America.

== History ==
Founded in 1892 out of the YMCA movement as World's Gospel Union, Avant Ministries is one of the oldest missionary sending agencies in the United States. Avant was the first evangelical Christian mission to enter Ecuador in South America and the Republic of Mali in West Africa.

Many of its first missionaries worked to translate the Bible into Quichua, Shuar, Berber, Bambara and Arabic in order to bring the Bible to those people groups in isolated areas.

In 2003, under the leadership of Dr. J. Paul Nyquist, Gospel Missionary Union changed its name to Avant Ministries. In 2004, Avant began a new philosophy of ministry called Short-Cycle Church Planting in order to have a more focused approach to church planting.

== Ecuador, 1956 ==
GMU missionary Roger Youderian was one of the five missionaries killed in Ecuador in 1956. He was working with four other missionaries to make initial contact with the Waodani (Auca) tribe, including Nate Saint of Missionary Aviation Fellowship, and Ed McCully, Pete Fleming and Jim Elliot of Christian Mission in Many Lands. All five men were killed January 8, 1956, by Waodani (Auca) Indians on the beach of the Curaray River in the Ecuadorian jungle. GMU missionary Frank Drown led a rescue party through the jungle, locating the bodies of four of the men. Their story was reported widely in the American press and recounted by widow Elisabeth Elliot in her book, Through Gates of Splendor.

== Avant Today ==
Today, Avant missionaries partner with those indigenous churches to start church planting efforts of their own. Avant also continues to send missionaries to areas where the Gospel has never been heard before.

Avant currently has about 500 missionaries serving in over 50 countries around the world.

== Short-Cycle Church Planting ==
Avant pioneered the Short-Cycle Church Planting (SCCP) philosophy of ministry which, according to the ministry, "recognizes the power of God and utilizes teams in order to plant a biblically mature, reproducing church in as short a time as possible" 6 and uses a three-pronged approach including: Evangelism, Discipleship, and National Leadership Training.
