= Rachel Saint =

American linguist (1914–1994)

- Born: January 2, 1914; Wyncote, Pennsylvania
- Died: November 11, 1994 (aged 80); Quito, Ecuador
- Occupation: Missionary
- Parent(s): Lawrence Saint; Katherine Saint
- Relatives: Nate Saint (brother), Dan Saint (brother); David Saint (brother); Sam Saint (brother); Phil Saint (brother); Nate Saint (brother); Steve Saint (brother)

Rachel Saint (January 2, 1914 – November 11, 1994) was an American evangelical Christian missionary who worked in Ecuador, with her language helper Dayuma translating the Gospel of Mark and the book of Acts into the Wao tededo (language) of the Waorani people.

== Early life and education ==
Rachel Saint was born in Wyncote, Pennsylvania on January 2, 1914. She attended the Philadelphia School of the Bible (now Cairn University) and then worked at the Keswick Colony of Mercy in New Jersey, a rehabilitation facility for people with alcohol addiction.

== Career ==
At 35 years old, in 1948, Rachel left the recovering alcoholics mission she had been serving at to become a missionary in the Amazon region. Saint was sent out by the Wycliffe Bible Translators, trained by the Summer Institute of Linguistics (now SIL Global). Her first missionary assignment was to the Piro and Shapira tribes in Peru. Her work there began to become well-known after the publication of the life of Tariri, a Shapra chief who left head-hunting after being introduced to Christianity. However, even at that time, Saint had an interest in the Waorani people of Ecuador. At the invitation of the then president of Ecuador, Velazco Ibarra, Wycliffe was invited and encouraged to work in his country, information shared at a Wycliffe Bible Translators meeting in Peru, with Cameron Townsend, the founder of the mission. After meeting the president herself (in the red headdress Chief Tariri had given her as a farewell gift), together with a group of Wycliffe Bible Translators, Rachel Saint expressed her specific wish to contact and share the Gospel to the Aucas. President Ibarra, confused, stated that "No white person has ever been able to live among them. Are you sure you really want to do that?". To which Saint responded "Yes, I believe God will make a way for me to do that." In February 1955, she and Catherine Peeke went to a missionary station near Waorani territory, where Saint's brother was working. Rachel Saint started learning the Waorani language with the help of Dayuma, a Waorani woman who had left her people after her father lost his life in a revenge killing. She fled to the plantation of Don Carlos Sevilla, where she worked on his plantation for eight years before being contacted by Rachel Saint, who expressed an interest in learning her language.

In January 1956, five missionaries in the area were killed by Waorani people, including her brother Nate Saint, who had come to Ecuador in 1948. As a result, Saint considered herself spiritually bonded to the tribe. In 1957, she embarked on a tour of the United States together with Dayuma, appearing with Billy Graham at Madison Square Garden and on Ralph Edwards' television show This Is Your Life.

In the summer of 1958, Saint returned to the Waorani in Ecuador and, together with Elisabeth Elliot, the wife of James (Jim) Elliot, who had been killed by the Waorani, continued to evangelize. In February 1959, they were able to move into a Waorani settlement. Where the five American men had failed to gain entrance into the Waorani society, these two unarmed women (as well as Elliot's little daughter) were not perceived as a threat. Saint continued in her labor to create a dictionary of the Waorani language that she had begun before the death of the five missionaries.

== Criticism ==
Saint appears in Joe Kane's book, Savages, in which she is criticized for the negative effects her proselytizing allegedly had on the lifestyle of those Waorani who chose to live in her village.

Saint also appears in Nemonte Nenquimo’s book, We Will Be Jaguars, published in September 2024. The book includes a photo of Saint welcoming an oil company executive to Nenquimo’s village, and Nenquimo accuses Saint of helping foreign oil companies to take over indigenous land.

In her book, God in the Rainforest, Kathryn T. Long describes criticisms of Saint by other missionaries and by Summer Institute of Linguistics staff. Long primarily cites SIL anthropologist James Yost and SIL linguist Catherine Peeke, who argued that Saint exercised excessive control over the Waorani, gave Dayuma too much authority within the community, relied on social pressure in evangelism, was unwilling to cooperate with other missionaries, and misunderstood Waorani culture.

=== Nemonte Nenquimo's account in We Will Be Jaguars ===
In her autobiographical book We will be jaguars, Indigenous activist Nemonte Nenquimo shares her perspective on what it was like to grow up in the community of Toñampare with Rachel Saint as its spiritual leader. According to Nenquimo’s account, Rachel Saint managed to establish a position of power within the community through religion, gifts, shame, and guilt. For example, the missionary discouraged Indigenous people from carrying out their traditional activities, claiming that doing so pleased the devil. Regarding a specific episode, the author recounts that Rachel Saint made her community ashamed of their nakedness and their joy after interrupting a dance involving the entire community and telling them that, by dancing without clothes, they were fanning the flames of the devil.

Rachel Saint received financial support from oil companies operating in the area to maintain an inventory of Western goods, which she gave to Indigenous people who complied with her demands. According to the author, this system of gifts allowed Saint to create dependency among the residents of Toñampare and compel them to attend church services. Gradually, these mechanisms gave Rachel Saint power over the community.

When the God–Devil dichotomy was no longer sufficient, Rachel Saint used the label “communists” to refer to Indigenous people who opposed the presence of oil companies in their territory. Nenquimo quotes the words of the mother of a community member whom Saint referred to in these terms and who was later shot in the head, a crime that went unpunished. The mother expressed that her son fought against the company and against the cowori whom Rachel invited onto their lands. And they shot him in the head and left him to die on the oil road.

As the book suggests, Rachel Saint appears to have received financial benefits for acting as a facilitator for oil companies seeking to operate in the territory. The author recounts how Saint informed the community about the oil companies, explaining that they were devout followers of God who had come to the territory with the sole intention of helping. Her intellectual and moral authority in Toñampare meant that these claims were taken for granted. Consequently, when the company’s planes and helicopters landed in the territory, Indigenous people not only refrained from showing hostility but also warmly welcomed company executives and politicians. According to the Indigenous community’s interpretation, the missionary was the one who paved the way for oil extraction and the construction of a road in the area, leveraging the authority and role as a spokesperson that she had acquired within the community. The book also conveys the impressions of several community members that Rachel Saint received substantial financial benefits from these interventions. At Saint’s wake in Toñampare, community members found sacks of money among her belongings, which they decided to burn because they believed that the oil company gave it to her so she would let them onto their lands.

A particular episode in the book sheds light on how the author understood the relationship between Rachel Saint and the members of the Toñampare community. On the day of Saint’s burial in Waorani territory, the first tears were shed only after Dayuma, her Waorani assistant, asked those present to cry. In addition, the coffin accidentally fell with great force into the grave where it was to be buried. The sound of the impact prompted widespread laughter among those present, who burst into laughter around the grave.

== Death ==
Saint died in Quito from cancer on November 11, 1994 at the age of 80. She was buried in Toñampare, Ecuador, where she had lived with the Waorani.

== Film ==
- Trinkets and beads. Documentary, Ecuador/USA 1996, 52 minutes; Director: Chris Walker; Producer: Tony Avirgan. “Chris Walker and Tony Avirgan’s films tells the tragi-comic story of the unlikely links between Maxus – a Texas-based oil company – the 79-year-old Wycliffe Bible Translators missionary Rachel Saint, and the Huaorani people of the Ecuadorian Orient, the most fiercely isolated tribe in the Amazon. First introduced to the Indians by the missionaries, Maxus is guilty of poisoning Huaorani land with its drills and flares and leaking pipelines.”

== Relevant literature ==
- Anderson, Gerald H. (1998). Biographical Dictionary of Christian Missions. Grand Rapids / Cambridge: Wm. B. Eerdmans. ISBN 0-8028-4680-7.
- Cabodevilla, Miguel Angel (1994). Los Huaorani en la historia de los pueblos del oriente [The Huaoroni in the History of the peoples of the Orient] (in Spanish). Coca: CICAME.
- Goffin, Alvin M. (1994). The Rise of Protestant Evangelism in Ecuador, 1895–1990. Gainesville: University Press of Florida. ISBN 0-8130-1260-0.
- Hefley, James (1982). Unstilled Voices. Hodder and Stoughton.
- Howe, Robert W (2003). Tigres of the night: The true story of Juan and Amalia Arcos, naturalists and lay missionaries in the jungle of eastern Ecuador, 1922–2003. Xlibris. ISBN 1-4134-1503-2.
- Kimerling, Judith (1991). Amazon crude. Natural Resource Defense. ISBN 0-9609358-5-1.
- Kingsland, Rosemary (1980). A Saint among Savages. Collins. ISBN 0-00-216740-9.
- Long, Kathryn T. (2019). God in the Rainforest: A Tale of Martyrdom and Redemption in Amazonian Ecuador. New York: Oxford University Press. ISBN 9780190608989.
- Rowell, Andrew (1996). Green Backlash: Global Subversion of the Environment Movement. London / New York: Routledge. ISBN 0-415-12827-7.
- Stoll, David (2004). Fishers of men or founders of empire? The Wycliffe Bible Translators in Latin America. Berghahn Books. ISBN 978-0-86-232111-6.
- Stowell, Joseph M. (1998). Following Christ. Grand Rapids: Zondervan. ISBN 0-310-21934-5.
- Tucker, Ruth A. (2004). From Jerusalem to Irian Jaya: A Biographical History of Christian Missions. Grand Rapids: Zondervan. ISBN 0-310-23937-0.
- United States Congress, House Committee on International Relations (1977). Protection of Americans Abroad: Hearings Before the Subcommittee on International Operations. Washington: US Government Printing Office.
- Wallis, Ethel E. (1960). The Dayuma story: Life under Auca spears. New York: Harper.
- Yost, James A (1981). "Twenty years of contact: the mechanisms of change in Huao ("Auca") culture". In Whitten, Jr, Norman E (ed.). pp. 677-704, Cultural transformations and ethnicity in modern Ecuador. Champaigne-Urbana: University of Illinois Press.
- Nenquimo, Nemote (2024). Anderson, Mitch (ed.). We Will Be Jaguars: A Memoir of My People/ We Will Not Be Saved: A Memoir of My People. Waorani Reservation, Ecuador: Abram’s Press.
