= Roger Youderian =

American Christian missionary (1924–1956)

- Roger Youderian
- Born: January 21, 1924; Sumatra, Montana
- Died: January 8, 1956 (aged 31); Curaray River, Ecuador
- Education: Montana State College (1941–43); University of Northwestern St. Paul (1946–50)
- Occupations: U.S. Army soldier (1943–46); Missionary (1953–56)
- Spouse: Barbara Youderian
- Children: 2

Roger Youderian (January 21, 1924 – January 8, 1956) was an American Christian missionary to Ecuador who, along with four others, was killed while attempting to evangelize the Huaorani people through efforts known as Operation Auca.

== Early life ==
Youderian was born in Sumatra, Montana. He contracted polio at the age of nine, crippling him slightly. He overcame the effects of the disease during high school, making it possible for him to play basketball. After graduating from Fergus High School in Lewistown, Montana in 1941, he attended Montana State College (now Montana State University) until he enlisted in the U.S. Army in 1943.

== World War II ==
As a paratrooper stationed in England, he assisted an Army chaplain and eventually became a Christian. In 1944, he participated in the Operation Varsity and the Battle of the Bulge, and then returned to Montana in 1946.

== Post war ==
Youderian was a member of Emmanuel Baptist Church in Lewistown, Montana, and played the piano for the church.

Youderian entered Northwestern College near Minneapolis, Minnesota, by this time having been called to the mission field. There he studied Christian education and met Barbara Orton. Youderian graduated from Northwestern College in 1950. He and Orton married in 1951, and they applied to be missionaries with the nondenominational mission board Gospel Missionary Union. Upon being accepted, they underwent training for six months in Kansas City in preparation for their work in Ecuador.

== Ministry in Ecuador ==
Youderian, his wife, and their infant daughter Beth left for Ecuador in 1953, staying first in Quito to study Spanish and eventually moving to Macuma, a mission station in the country's southern jungle. There, he and his wife worked with fellow Gospel Missionary Union missionaries Frank and Marie Drown, a veteran missionary couple ministering to the Jivaro people. The Youderians focused on learning the language and developing a literacy program, and with that in mind, Roger spent time visiting Jivaro homes and learning more about their culture.

After working with them for about a year, Youderian and his family began ministering to a tribe related to the Jivarro, the Achuar people. He worked with missionary pilot Nate Saint to provide important medical supplies, but after a period of attempting to build relationships with them, he failed to see any positive effect and, growing depressed, considered returning to the United States. However, during this time, four other missionaries in Ecuador were planning Operation Auca, an attempt to reach another group of people, the Auca. Nate Saint approached Youderian about joining their team to meet the Auca, and he assented.

On January 3, 1956, Youderian set up camp at "Palm Beach" along the Curaray River with Jim Elliot and Ed McCully. During the day, they were joined by Nate Saint and Pete Fleming. Having already contacted and exchanged gifts through the air with the Auca, the men hoped to have friendly encounters with them. On January 6, several Auca approached them and appeared to be friendly, but two days later, all five were attacked and killed by a group of Auca warriors. According to reports, Youderian was speared while he was trying to radio to Shell for help. He was also the last of the missionaries to be speared. His body was later pulled from the river and buried at Palm Beach in a common grave with three of the other men. All family members were safely returned to the United States where they still reside today.
