= Let Me Be a Woman =

1976 book by Elisabeth Elliot

Let Me Be a Woman: Notes to My Daughter on the Meaning of Womanhood
- First edition
- Author: Elisabeth Elliot
- Language: English
- Subject: Christian views on marriage Gender roles in Christianity; Women in the Bible
- Genre: Christian devotional literature
- Publisher: Tyndale House
- Publication date: 1976
- Publication place: United States
- Pages: 185
- ISBN: 0842321616

Let Me Be a Woman: Notes to My Daughter on the Meaning of Womanhood is a 1976 book by Elisabeth Elliot that was published by Tyndale House in Wheaton, Illinois, United States. The book is 185 pages long and is about what is written about women in the Bible. The book also provides advice about marriage. Elliot gave the book to Valerie, her only child, as a gift on the day of her wedding. Elliot used the phrase "Let me be a woman" in response to Christian egalitarianism, which she said was "not a goal to be desired [because] it is a dehumanizing distortion." Her use of the phrase in this manner in 1977 at the National Women's Conference in Houston, Texas evoked considerable applause. The book contains several stories, the first of which telling about how God brought two people together from across the world into a romantic relationship with each other because of their obedience to God's leading. Another story is about the murder of John and Betty Stam, Christian martyrs. A prayer by Betty Stam is also included in the book. The prayer asks that the full will of God be done in her life, irrespective of the cost to herself. In 2003, Andrew Farmer of Crosswalk.com quoted a portion of the book in support of his argument that singleness is a spiritual gift that God gives to single people for the period in which they are single.
