= Dayuma =

Huaorani leader (c. 1930–2014)

- Born: ca. 1924; Fish River, Ecuador
- Died: March 1, 2014
- Other name: Dayumae
- Citizenship: Huaorani
- Spouse: Komi
- Parent(s): Caento (father); Akawo (mother)
- Relatives: Wawe (brother); Onaenga (sister); Gimade (sister); Nampa (brother); Oba (sister); Wamoni (uncle); Gikita (uncle); Mincaye (cousin)

Dayuma (also Dayumae) (born ca. 1930 — March 1, 2014) was a member of the Huaorani tribe and a citizen of Ecuador. She is a central figure in the Operation Auca saga, in that she was the first Huao to convert to Christianity, as well as the missionaries' key to unlocking the Huaorani language, a language that had not been previously studied. Later Dayuma also became an influential figure in her tribe.

== Biography ==
Dayuma was born sometime in the early 1930s in the rain forest of eastern Ecuador. As a member of the Huaorani tribe, she grew up among her people in the wilderness. She had straight black hair, tea-colored skin, and was a few inches above five feet.

When she was young, her family was terrorized by a Huao warrior named Moipa, who had attacked and speared many of her family. On one occasion, her father was mortally wounded in an attack. This prompted Dayuma to flee from her tribe, along with two other girls, and to go live with the friendlier Quechua people. Many of her family urged her not to leave, believing that all outsiders were cannibals, but Dayuma was convinced that her chances of survival were greater if she fled than if she stayed.

When she came to a river at the edge of the jungle, Dayuma saw a group of foreigners coming down the river in canoes. As she crossed over to them, the men raised their guns to fire at her, but for whatever reason they did not. When Dayuma arrived safely on the other side of the river, she called back to the two other girls who had come with her, and they came over as well. It was then that she received modern clothing for the first time, since the Huaorani traditionally only wear strings around their waists, wrists, and ankles.

Dayuma lived outside of Huaorani territory on a hacienda for many years. There were many Quechuas there, as well as people from other places. Over time she began to assimilate into the Quechua culture and language. It was there that she was befriended by an American missionary named Rachel Saint, who took interest in learning the Huaorani language, "Huao Terero". This is notable as Huao is a language isolate, and had never been studied before this time. Dayuma was a great help to Saint, despite the fact that she had forgotten much of her language and did not speak English.

In 1955, Jim Elliot, along with four other male missionaries including Rachel's brother, Nate Saint, were making plans to contact the Huaorani without Rachel's knowledge. They met with Dayuma while Rachel was away and learned Huao phrases from her. When the men first arrived in Huaorani territory in early 1956, they were met by three friendly Huaorani – a man and two women. One of the women was Dayuma's sister, Gimade. One of the reasons that she had come to meet with the missionaries was to see if they knew what had happened to Dayuma. Two days later, the men were killed by a larger group of the Huaorani, including some of Dayuma's immediate family, in unclear circumstances.

Not long afterwards, while still living at the hacienda and working closely with Rachel Saint, Dayuma converted to Christianity. Rachel Saint began to teach her more about the Bible and Dayuma continued to teach Rachel more of her language. Then in 1958, two women from Dayuma's tribe emerged from the jungle and wanted her to return with them, telling her that her mother, Akawo, was still alive. Dayuma returned with them, and soon came back to the Quechua village with an invitation for Rachel Saint, along with Elisabeth Elliot and her three-year-old daughter Valerie, to come and live with them.

Thus began the first peaceful outside contact recorded with the Huaorani tribe. Dayuma taught the language, and was instrumental in converting much of her family to Christianity. Elisabeth Elliot said "Dayuma was the preacher." Christianity might have had a large effect on the tribe; most touted the number of homicides plunged by almost 90%. Dayuma also had learned to sew while she was living with the Quechuas, and she made clothes for her people. Dayuma remained with the Huaorani until her death in the village of Toñampade, near to where the five missionary men were killed in 1956. It is also the location of theirs and Rachel Saint's graves.

== Bibliography ==
- Hitt, Russell T. Jungle Pilot
- Long, Kathryn T. (2019). God in the Rainforest: A Tale of Martyrdom and Redemption in Amazonian Ecuador. New York: Oxford University Press. ISBN 9780190608989.
- Saint, Steve. End of the Spear (book)
- Wallis, Ethel Emily. Dayuma: Life Under Waorani Spears
- Ziegler-Otero, Lawrence (2004), Resistance in an Amazonian Community: Huaorani Organizing against the Global Economy, US: Berghahn Books, ISBN 978-1-84545306-0.
- Beyond the Gates of Splendor (documentary film)
