= Frank Drown =

American author and missionary (1922–2018)

Frank Drown (September 30, 1922 - January 22, 2018) was an American author and former missionary. He and his wife Marie were missionaries with Gospel Missionary Union and worked for 37 years with the Jívaro Indians of eastern Ecuador, who were known for their head shrinking.

The Drowns were asked to write a book about their lives as missionaries. After the success of Elisabeth Elliot's best-seller Through Gates of Splendor, the publishers believed such a book would be in demand. And so the Drowns co-authored a book which became their memoirs, titled Mission to the Headhunters, followed by Unmarked Memories: Five friends buried in the jungle of Ecuador.

Drown was interviewed for the 2004 documentary Beyond the Gates of Splendor where he described in detail what happened during the search party's expedition.
