= Lawrence Saint =

American stained glass artist (1885–1961)

- Lawrence Saint working in his studio
- Born: January 30, 1885; Sharpsburg, Pennsylvania, US
- Died: June 22, 1961 (aged 76); Philadelphia, Pennsylvania, US
- Resting place: Mount Vernon Cemetery
- Education: Pennsylvania Academy of the Fine Arts
- Occupation: Artist
- Spouse(s): Katherine Saint (née Proctor) (June 10, 1910 – June 22, 1961)
- Children: Sam Saint (b. 1911); Phil Saint (b. 1912); Rachel Saint (b. 1914); Dan Saint (b. 1915); Dave Saint (b. 1916); Steve Saint (b. 1918); Nate Saint (b. 1923); Ben Saint (b. 1927)
- Parent(s): Joseph Alexander Saint; Jennie Bradford

Lawrence Bradford Saint (January 30, 1885 – June 22, 1961) was an American stained glass artist. His work is most notably featured in the Washington National Cathedral where he served as the head of the stained glass department.

== Early life ==
Lawrence Saint was born in 1885 in Sharpsburg, Pennsylvania, just outside Pittsburgh. His father, Joseph A. Saint, was also an artist, who specialized in landscape painting and silhouette cutting. Although never formally trained nor immensely successful commercially, Joseph was a talented artist and continued to paint until he was 76 years old.

When Lawrence was a young boy, the family moved to De Haven, Pennsylvania (now Allison Park), which was very rural in the late 19th century. Joseph enjoyed the countryside as it inspired him in painting landscapes. They soon moved again to the East End of Pittsburgh where Joseph worked in novelty advertising. At the age of 12, Lawrence sold newspapers. Then at 13, he left school and worked at a wallpaper shop where he learned about color harmony. During his spare time at the shop, he would make sketches of horses or people in the street.

== Education ==
After seeing one of these sketches, a stained glass artist offered Saint a job as an apprentice in his studio. It was there that Saint learned to grind paint and trace patterns.

In 1905, after a three-year apprenticeship, Saint entered the Pennsylvania Academy of the Fine Arts (PAFA) in Philadelphia, Pennsylvania to study painting. His second year there, he entered the Cresson Traveling Scholarship, a contest that offered a $500 trip to Europe. After entering, Saint learned that he was required to submit a drawing of a nude woman. Due to his Christian convictions, Saint was ready to drop out of the contest. But a friend suggest he ask to have the drawing exchanged for another. The scholarship committee agreed, and Saint went on to win the scholarship.

That trip to Europe would be the first of 5, and was the first time he came face to face with Medieval stained glass. This began his fascination with stained glass which led him to in-depth study of styles and techniques.

His last year of art school, Saint worked at an Italian mission on the south side of Philadelphia. It was there that he met Katherine Wright Proctor, who later became his wife.

== Work ==
Immediately after graduating from art school, Saint got a job with the H.F. Petgen Company in Pittsburgh. It was here that he designed his first stained glass window, a rose window for the Catholic Church of St. Peter and St. Paul in East Liberty, Pittsburgh. The window was a mosaic depicting the signs of the Four Evangelists.

Saint wanted to travel to Europe again in 1910. So, in order to take his fiancée along with him, they got married just before the trip. The simple ceremony was held at Katherine's house on June 10. The trip to Europe became their honeymoon, and it lasted just over a year. Katherine was a graduate of Wellesley College where she had studied art history, so she was very supportive and helpful to Lawrence in his work. Together they visited and studied many churches in England and France including Chartres Cathedral, Canterbury Cathedral, and Sainte Chapelle in Paris. They would often climb up the sides of the buildings to get a closer look at the windows in order for Lawrence to make drawings of them.

Saint's drawings of stained glass windows were published by the Victoria and Albert Royal Museum which included many of them in the book called Stained Glass of the Middle Ages in England and France published in 1913.

Saint eventually discovered a process to make his own stained glass in his backyard studio. This was necessary since the finest quality glass was not available on the commercial market at the time.

At the height of Saint's career, he was working to produce several windows for the National Cathedral in Washington, D.C. His first assignment was the three parable windows in St. Mary's Chapel north of the choir. Each of the three windows depicted seven of Christ's parables. His next assignment was the four miracle windows in St. John's Chapel south of the choir. He also created the large rose window in the northern transept, the three windows beneath it (Foretellers of Judgment), four other windows in the north transept, and three clerestory windows above the choir on the south wall (The Angel Windows).

Saint also served for seven years as the head of the cathedral's Department of Stained Glass.

The Metropolitan Museum of Art in New York City filmed an educational video in Saint's studio about stained glass.

Today, some of Saint's work can also be viewed at the Cleveland Museum of Art in Cleveland, Ohio.

Among Saint's works as a painter were detailed copies of portraits by a number of the Dutch Masters such as Jan Vermeer as well as original paintings of his own done in the style of masters such as Frans Hals. Saint was a serious student and scholar of the techniques of these 16th and 17th century masters, and to that end when creating works in their style instead of using commercial oil paints he made his own from scratch using the same materials, pigments, formulas, and manufacturing techniques developed by Dutch masters.

== Personal life ==
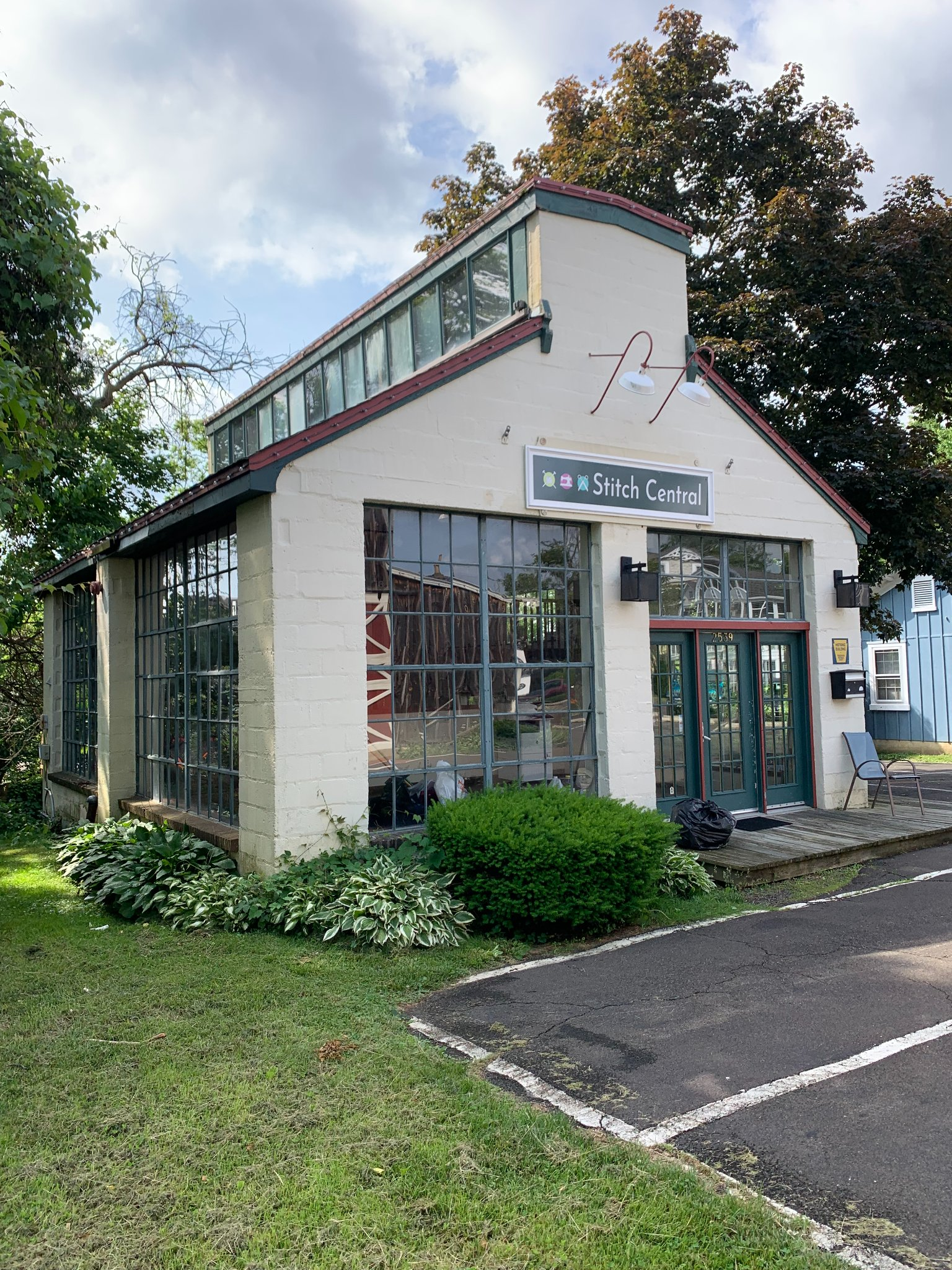
The stained glass workshop of Lawrence Saint in Huntingdon Valley, Pennsylvania.

The Saint family lived in Huntingdon Valley, Pennsylvania.

Saint was a Presbyterian who was well known for his dedication to the Christian faith. From 1920 to 1933, he was a ruling elder at the Huntingdon Valley Presbyterian Church, which is located just a short walk from his house and workshop. In the late 1950s Saint attended Bethany Baptist Church in the Fox Chase section of Philadelphia where he was a mentor to the church's children. Each child would receive a shiny penny for any bible verse they could recite to him. He inspired many with his outstanding faith and kindness. He was also a member of the Republican Party.

He and his wife Katherine had eight children – seven boys and one girl. As parents, the Saints were described as being religiously strict, but generally permissive in other areas. Four of his children grew up to work in full-time Christian ministry. Phil was the only child of the family to follow his father as an artist. He used chalk drawings in connection with his preaching ministry. Saint's only daughter, Rachel, was a missionary to Peru and later to Ecuador where she was instrumental in reaching the Huaorani tribe with the gospel. Nate was a missionary pilot who also went to Ecuador. In 1956, Nate was killed during Operation Auca, an earlier attempt to reach the Huaorani.

On June 22, 1961, Saint died of a heart attack at 76 years old.

== Bibliography ==
- Stained glass of the middle ages in England & France, painted by Lawrence B. Saint, described by Hugh Arnold. (London: Black, 1913)
- Knight of the Cross (Philadelphia: G. W. Jacobs, 1914) A modern Pilgrim's Progress.
- The memorial windows in the Washington cathedral to Lieutenant Matthew Fontaine Maury, U.S.N., the Honorable Myron T. Herrick [and] James Parmelee, esq. (Washington: private printing, 1940)
- Ponderin' Pete (Cleveland: Union Gospel Press, 1944) Folksy novel about becoming a Christian.
- The romance of stained glass, by Lawrence Saint: a story of his experiences and experiments. (Huntingdon Valley, Penna.: self-published, 1959) This is a mimeographed, 8.5 x 11 inch, stapled chapbook of more than 64 pages.

== Gallery ==
The Parable Windows (1929–30) – Washington National Cathedral, St. Mary's Chapel

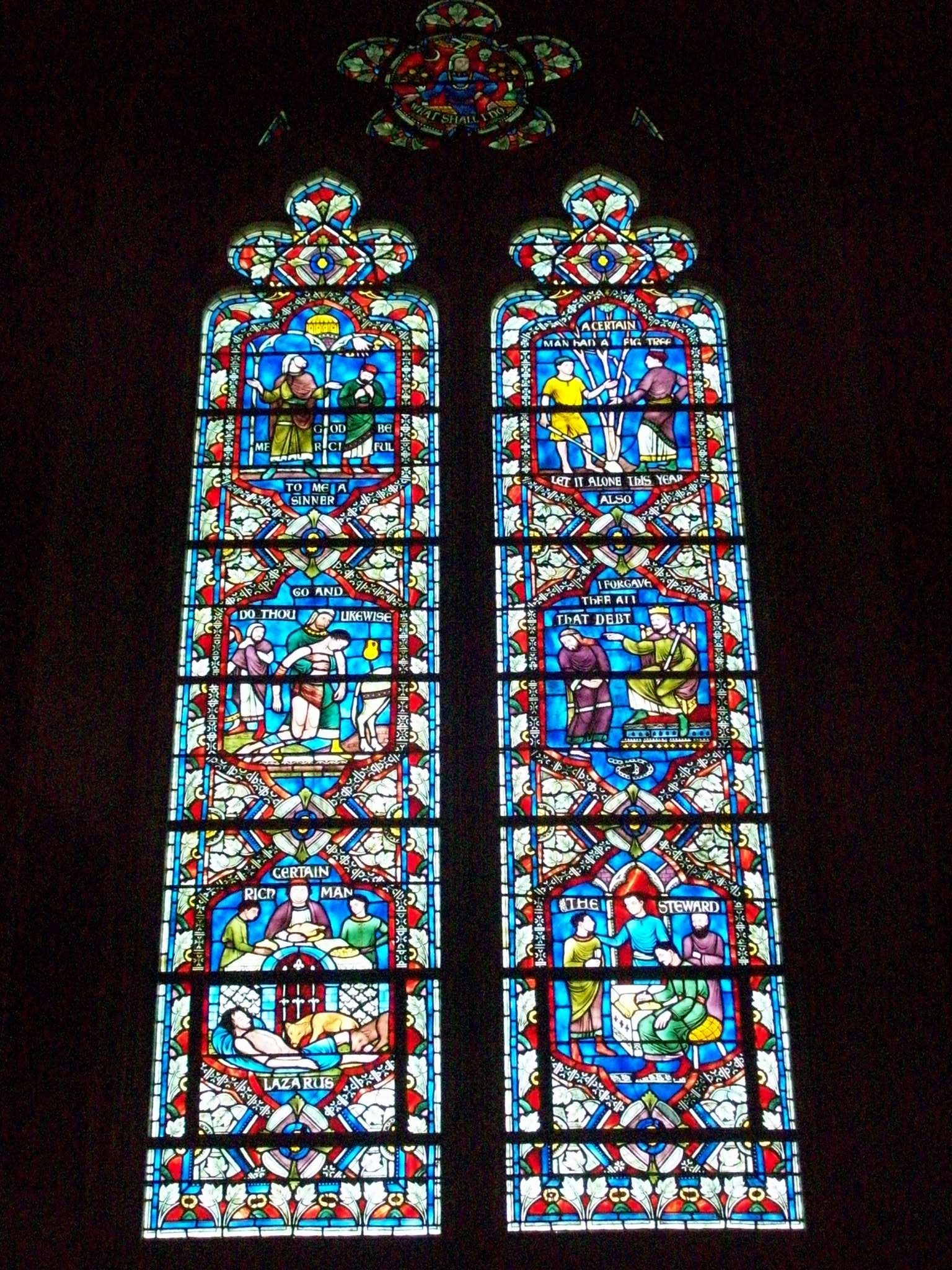

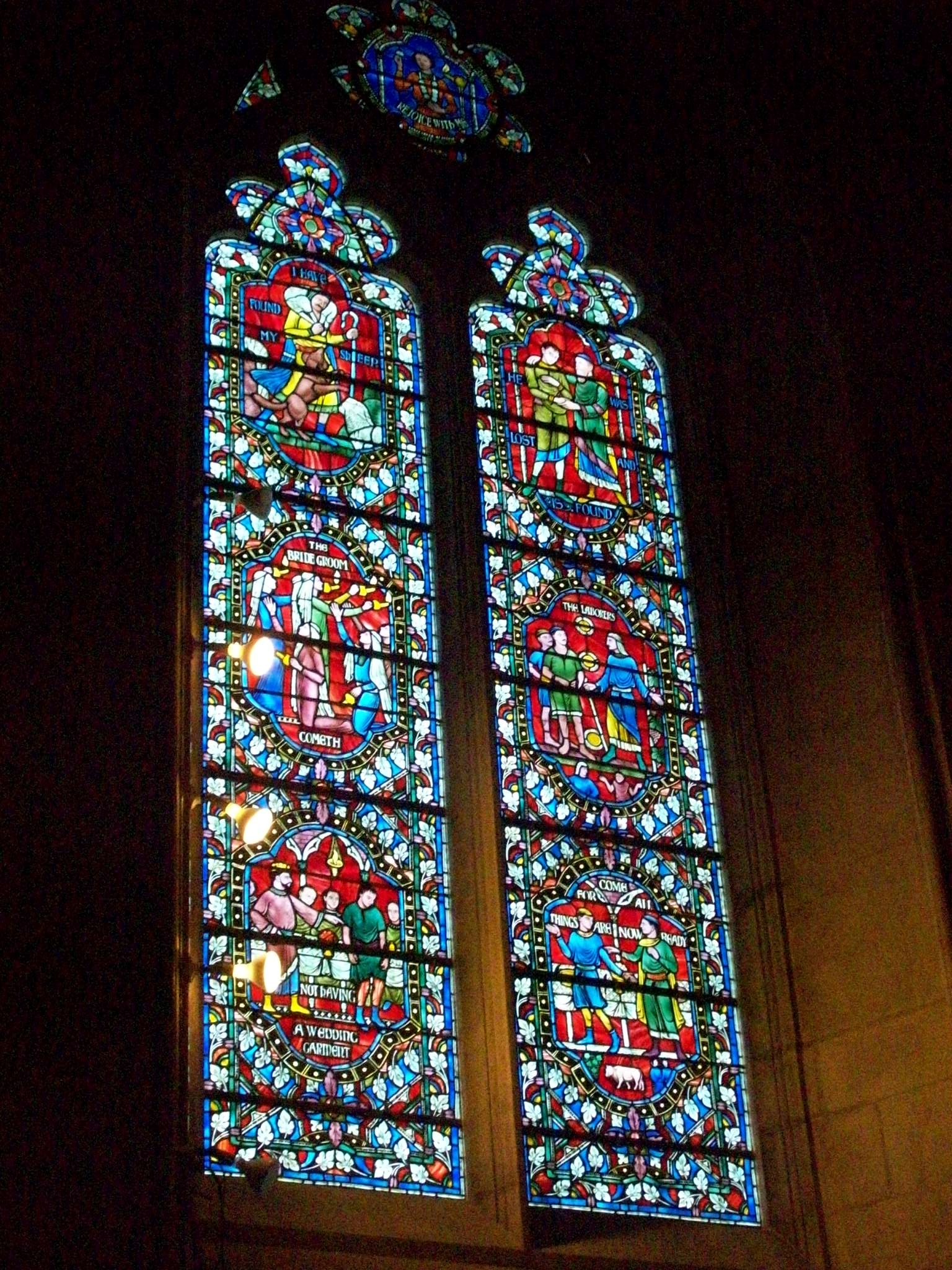

The Miracle Windows (1931) – Washington National Cathedral, St. John's Chapel

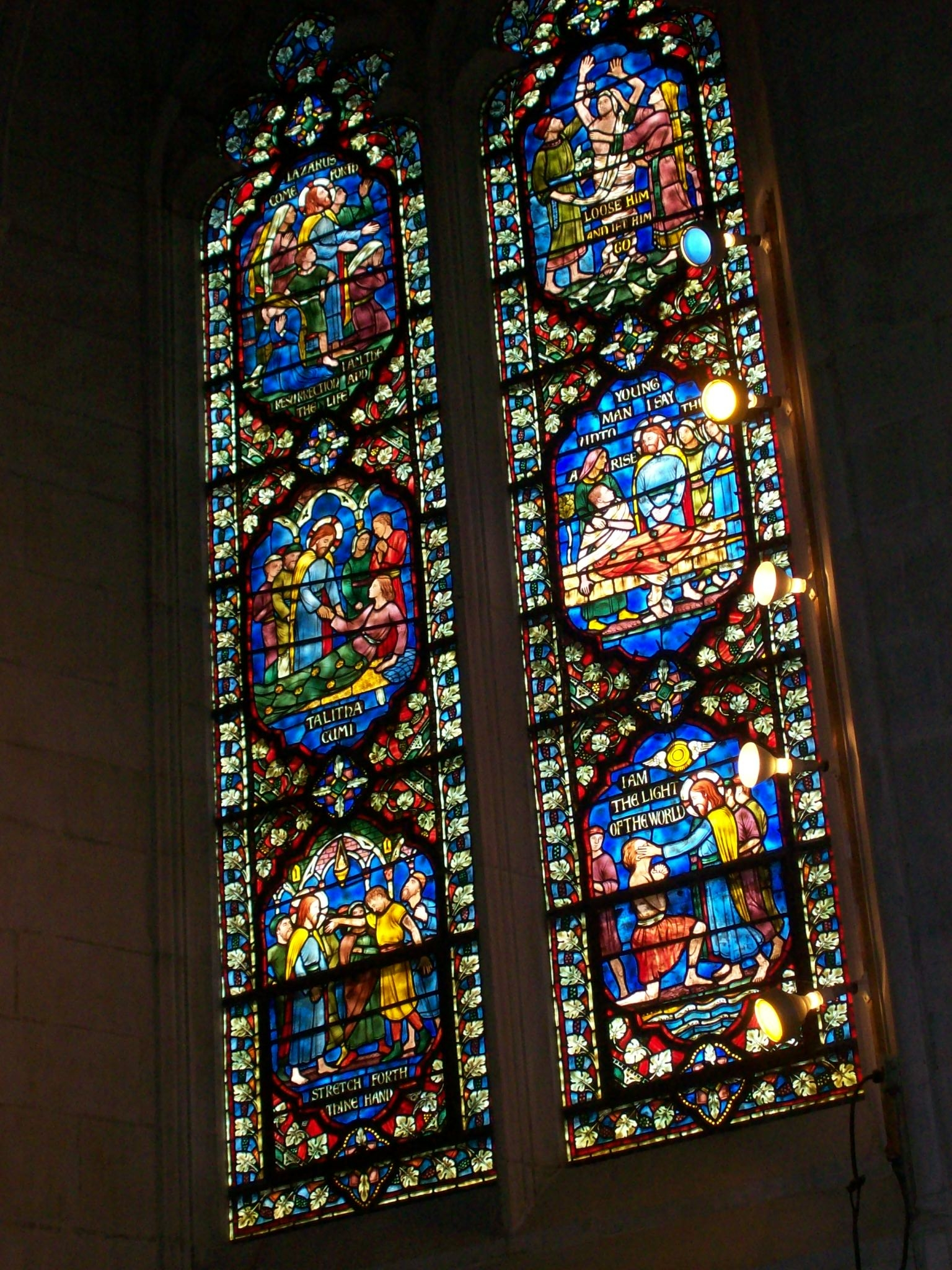

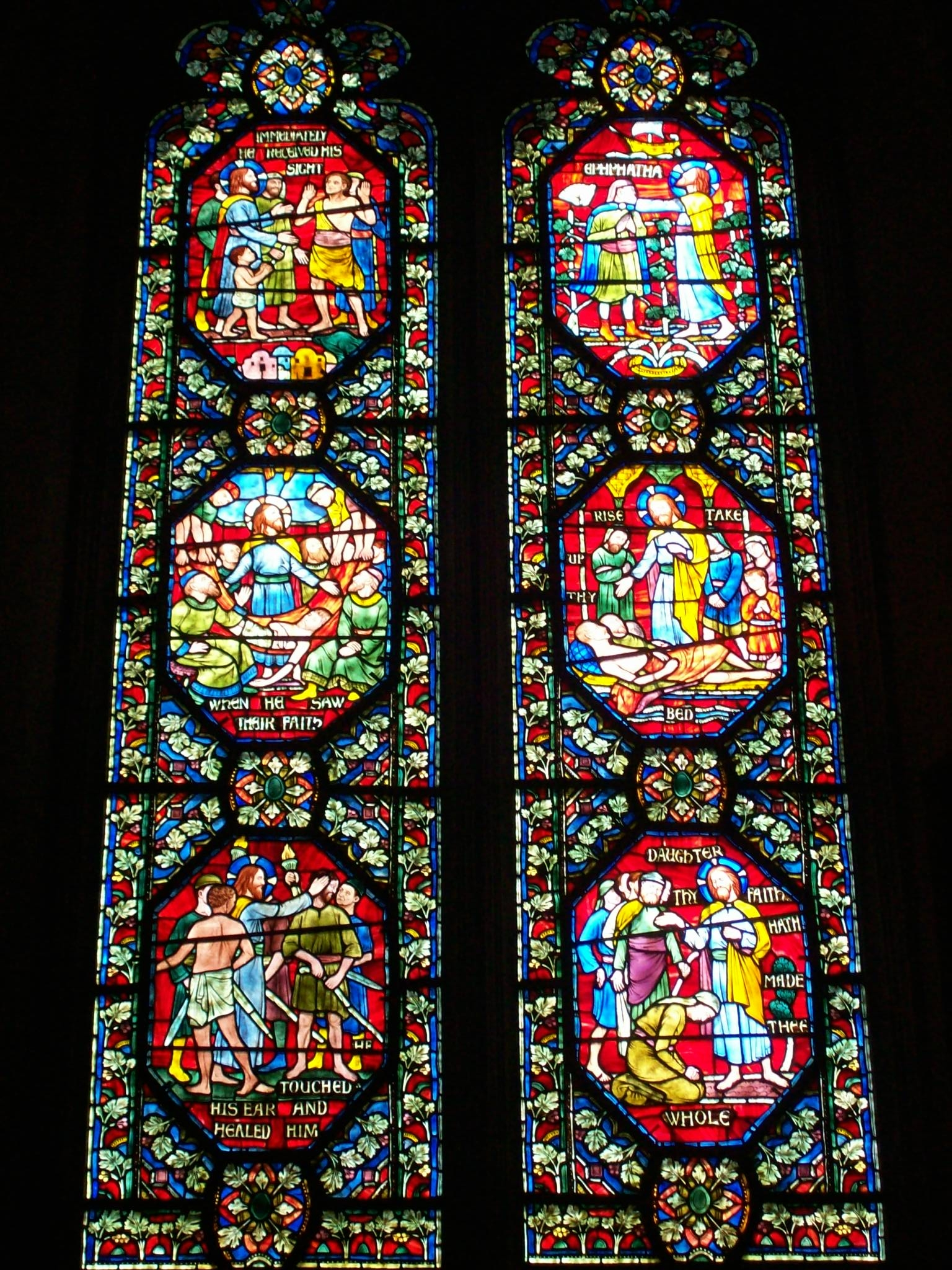

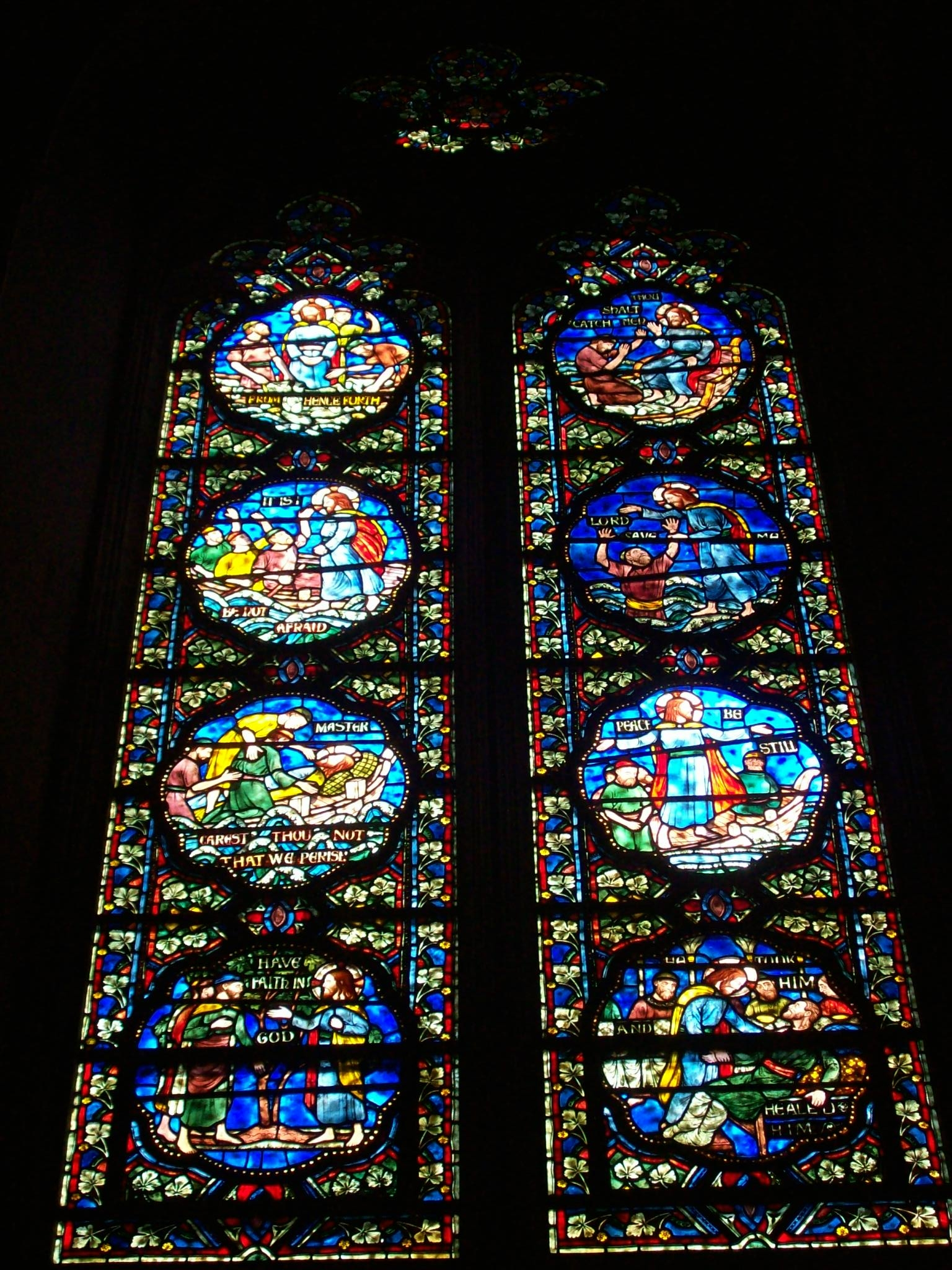

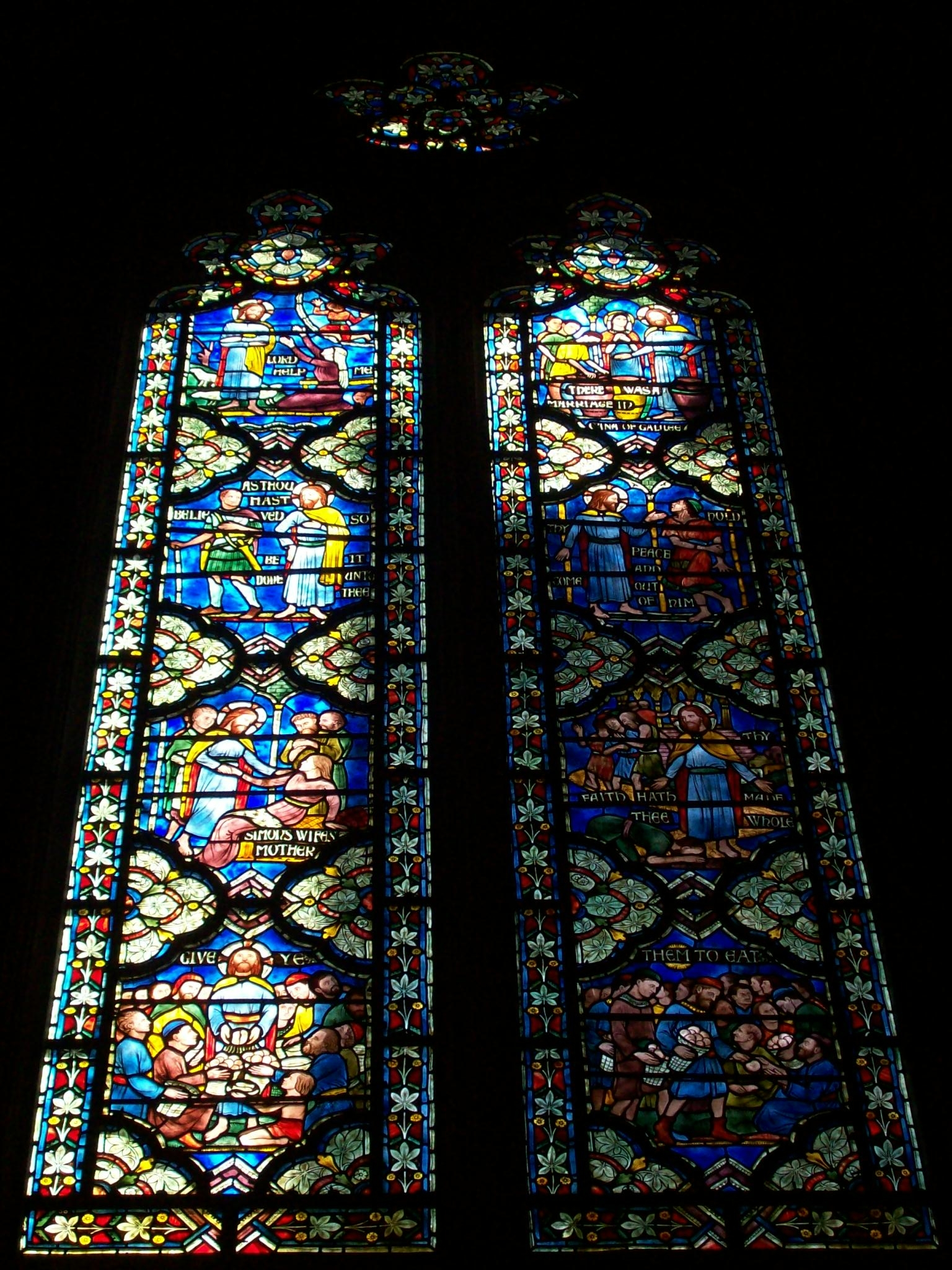

Other work at Washington National Cathedral

The North Rose Window (1932), depicting the Last Judgment

The Deborah and Barak Window (1933), north transept, west wall

The Angel Windows (1934), south clerestory choir windows

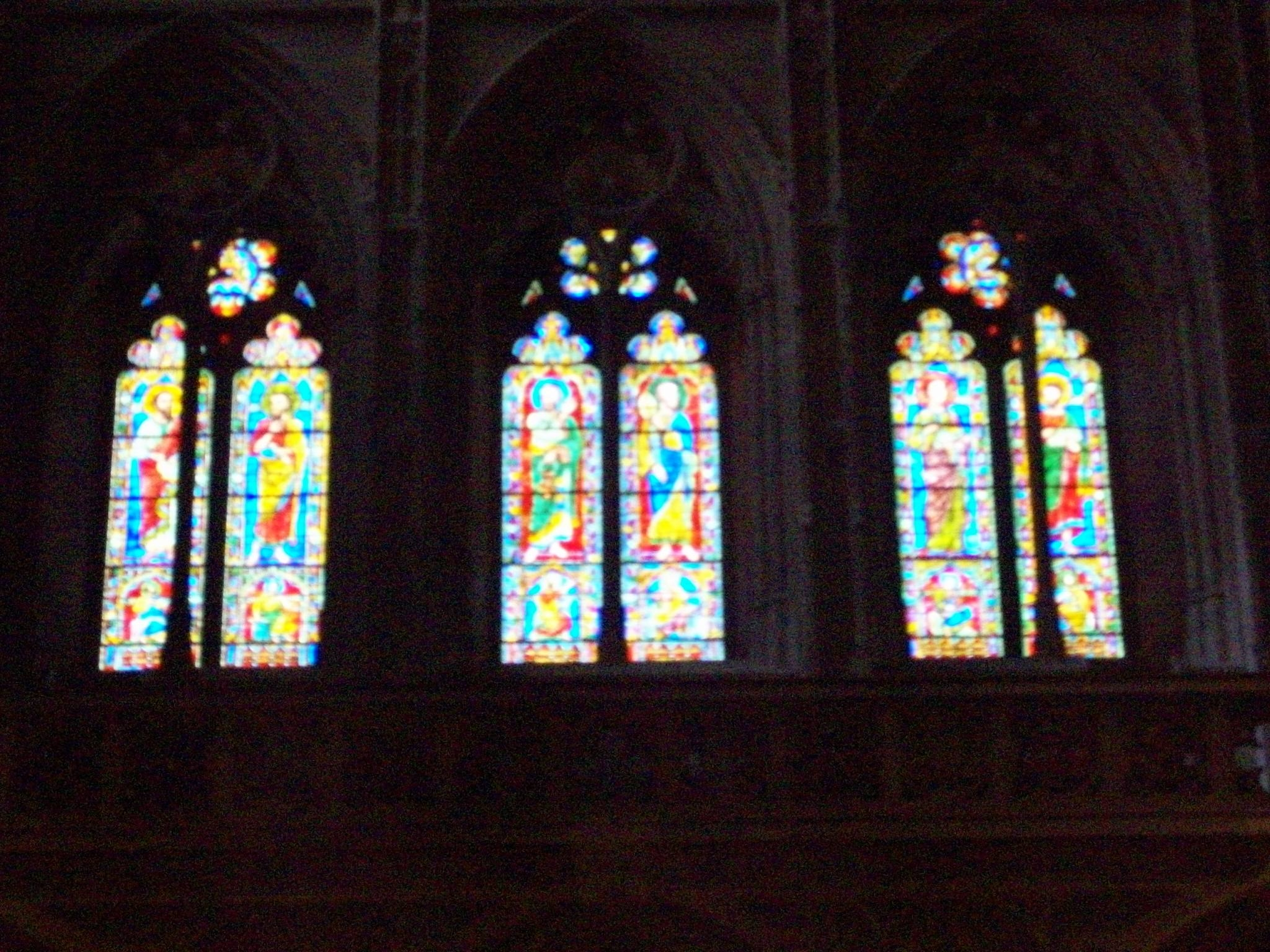
The Foretellers of Judgment (1935), directly beneath the North Rose Window

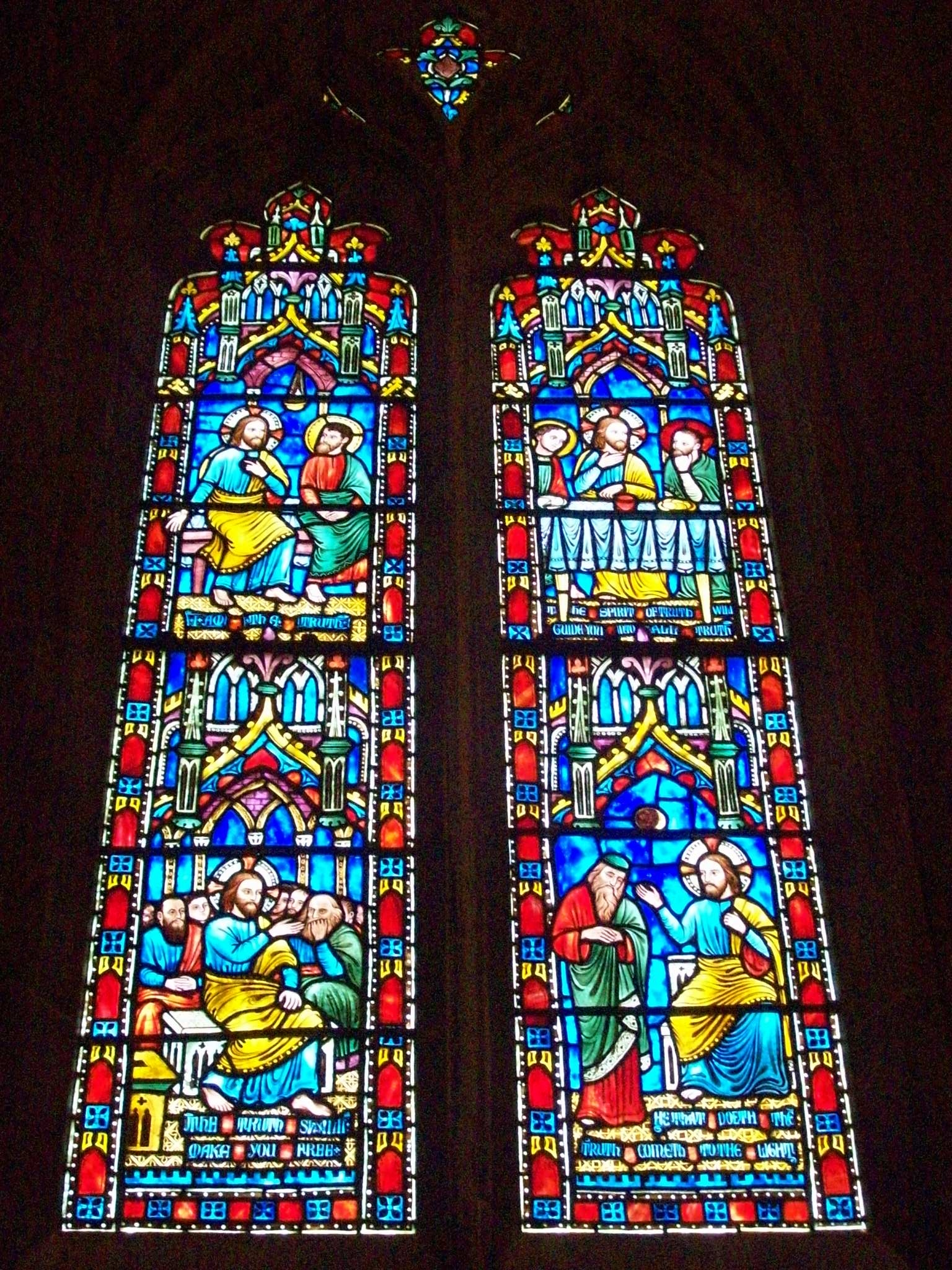
The Truth Window (1936), first of the Hildrup windows, north transept east wall

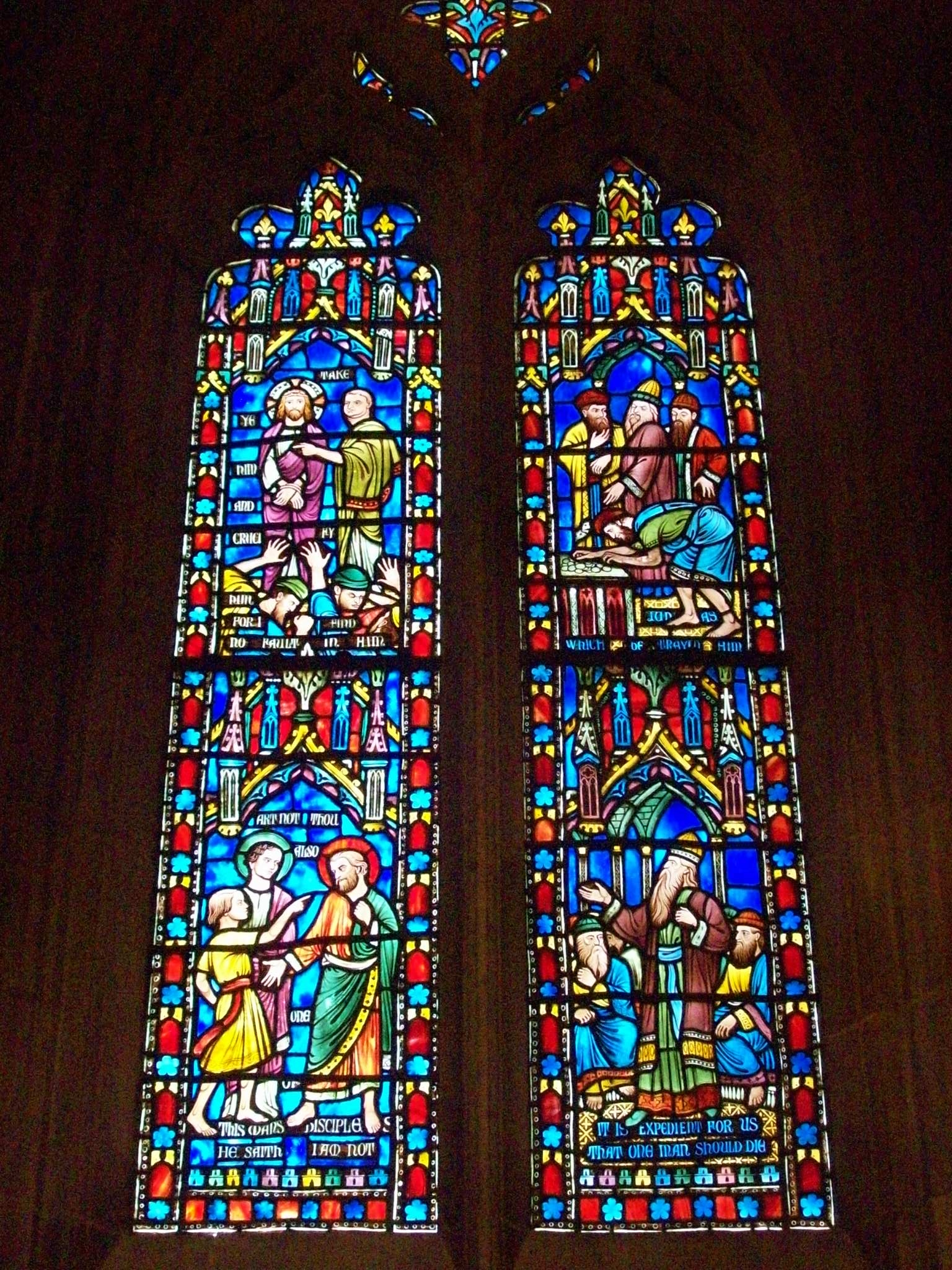
The Falsehood Window (1936) second of the Hildrup windows, north transept east wall

"Dutch Master" Paintings
