= Elisabeth Elliot =

American author (1926–2015)

- Born: Elisabeth Howard; December 21, 1926; Brussels, Belgium
- Died: June 15, 2015 (aged 88); Magnolia, Massachusetts
- Occupations: Missionary author public speaker
- Spouse: Jim Elliot (m. 1953; died 1956) Addison Leitch (m. 1969; died 1973) Lars Gren (m. 1977)
- Children: 1
- Writing career
- Genres: Biography; Christian living
- Website: www.elisabethelliot.org

Elisabeth Elliot (née Howard; December 21, 1926 – June 15, 2015) was an American Christian missionary, author, and speaker. Her first husband, Jim Elliot, was killed in 1956 while attempting to make missionary contact with the Waorani people of eastern Ecuador. She later spent two years as a missionary to the tribe members who killed her husband. After living in South America for many years, she returned to the United States, wrote over 20 books, and became widely known as an author and a speaker. Elliot toured the country well into her seventies, sharing her knowledge and talking about her experience.

== Early life and education ==
Elisabeth Elliot was born Elisabeth Howard in Brussels, Belgium, on December 21, 1926; her family included her missionary parents, four brothers, and one sister. Elisabeth's brothers, Thomas Howard and David Howard, are also authors.

Her family moved to the Germantown neighborhood of Philadelphia, Pennsylvania, when she was a few months old. In addition to Philadelphia, she lived in Franconia, New Hampshire, and Moorestown, New Jersey. She studied Classical Greek at Wheaton College, believing that it was the best tool to help her with the calling of ultimately translating the New Testament of the Bible into an unknown language.

It was at Wheaton that she met Jim Elliot. She graduated from Wheaton College in 1948. Before their marriage, Elisabeth completed a year of specialized post-graduate studies at the Prairie Bible Institute in Alberta where a campus prayer chapel was later named in her honor. Jim Elliot and Elisabeth Howard individually went to Ecuador to work with the Tsáchila.

== Career ==
After she married Elliot, she joined him in his work with the Quichua (or Quechua) indigenous people; the two married in Quito in 1953. In January 1956, her husband was speared to death along with four of his missionary friends while they were attempting to contact the Waorani people. Their daughter Valerie (born on February 27, 1955) was 10 months old when her father was killed. Elisabeth continued her work with the Quichua for two more years.

Two Waorani women living among the Quichua, including one named Dayuma, taught the Waorani language to Elisabeth and fellow missionary Rachel Saint. When Dayuma returned to the Waorani, she created an opening for contact by the missionaries. In October 1958, Elisabeth went to live with the Waorani with her three-year-old daughter Valerie and Saint. The Waorani gave her the tribal name Gikari, Wao for 'woodpecker'. She later returned to the Quichua and worked with them until 1963, when she and Valerie returned to Franconia, New Hampshire.

In 1969, Elisabeth married Addison Leitch, a professor of theology at Gordon–Conwell Theological Seminary in South Hamilton, Massachusetts. She became a member of the Episcopal Church with her second husband. Leitch died in 1973. In the fall of 1974, she became an adjunct professor on the faculty of Gordon–Conwell and for several years taught a course entitled "Christian Expression". In 1977, she married Lars Gren, a hospital chaplain.

In the mid-1970s, she served as one of the stylistic consultants for the committee of the New International Version of the Bible (NIV). She appears on the NIV's list of contributors. In 1981, Elisabeth was appointed writer-in-residence at Gordon College in Wenham, Massachusetts. From 1988 to 2001, she could be heard on a daily radio program, Gateway to Joy, produced by the Good News Broadcasting Association of Lincoln, Nebraska. She almost always opened the program with the phrase "'You are loved with an everlasting love,' – that's what the Bible says – 'and underneath are the everlasting arms.' This is your friend, Elisabeth Elliot..." Today re-runs of the program may be heard over the Bible Broadcasting Network.

== Later life and death ==
Elisabeth Elliot suffered from dementia during the last ten years of her life and stopped giving public presentations in 2004. She died in Magnolia, Massachusetts, on June 15, 2015. Shortly after her death, Steve Saint – the son of Nate Saint who was killed alongside Elliot's first husband – posted on Facebook about her final victory over "the loss of her mind to dementia" and "her ten year battle with the disease which robbed her of her greatest gift." She was interred at Hamilton Cemetery in Hamilton, Massachusetts.

== Bibliography ==
- Shadow of the Almighty: The Life and Testament of Jim Elliot, 1958, ISBN 978-0-06062213-8
- Through Gates of Splendor, 1957, ISBN 978-0-84237152-0
- The Savage My Kinsman, 1961, ISBN 978-1569550038
- No Graven Image: a Novel by Elisabeth Elliot, 1966, 19070. ISBN 978-0891072355
- Who Shall Ascend: The Life of R. Kenneth Strachan of Costa Rica, 1968, ISBN 034-0109513, ISBN 978-0340109519
- The Liberty of Obedience: Some Thoughts on Christian Conduct and Service, 1968, ISBN 089-2833580, ISBN 978-0892833580
- Furnace of the Lord: Reflections on the Redemption of The Holy City, 1969, ISBN 978-0340105979
- These Strange Ashes: The First Year As a Jungle Missionary, 1975, ISBN 978-0800759957
- A Slow and Certain Light: Some thoughts on the Guidance of God, 1976, ISBN 978-0876808641
- Let Me Be a Woman: Notes to My Daughter on the Meaning of Womanhood, 1976, ISBN 978-0842321624
- Twelve Baskets of Crumbs, 1977, ISBN 9780687427024
- The Journals of Jim Elliot, 1978, ISBN 978-0800758257
- Love Has a Price Tag, 1979, ISBN 9780830736881
- Marriage is a gift..., 1982, ISBN 0-89107-269-1, ISBN 0-7208-0625-9
- Discipline: The Glad Surrender, 1982, ISBN 978-0800731311
- Passion and Purity: Learning to Bring Your Love Life Under God's Control, 1984, ISBN 978-0800758189
- The Mark of a Man, 1981, ISBN 978-0800731328
- A Chance to Die: The Life and Legacy of Amy Carmichael, 1987, ISBN 978-0800730895
- Amy Carmichael: Her Life and Legacy, 1988, ISBN 1 85424 023 4, ISBN 0 86760 056 X
- Loneliness: It Can Be a Wilderness, It Can Be a Pathway to God, 1988, ISBN 0-8407-9098-8
- Trusting God in a Twisted World: And Other Reflections on Asking God Why, 1989, ISBN 0-8007-5303-8
- The Shaping of a Christian Family, 1992, ISBN 978-0800731021
- Keep a Quiet Heart, 1995, 1996, 2004, 2012, ISBN 978-0800759902
- Quest for Love, 1996, ISBN 9780800723149
- A Path Through Suffering: Discovering the Relationship Between God's Mercy and Our Pain, 1990, 1997 (large print) ISBN 978-0800724986
- Taking Flight: Wisdom for Your Journey, 1999, 2001, ISBN 978-0801011801
- The Music of His Promises: Listening to God with Love, Trust, and Obedience, 2000, ISBN 978-0800759919
- The Path of Loneliness: Finding Your Way Through the Wilderness to God, 2001, ISBN 978-0800732066
- Secure in the Everlasting Arms, 2002, 2004, ISBN 978-0800759933
- Be Still My Soul, 2003, ISBN 978-0-80075989-6
- Suffering Is Never For Nothing, 2019, ISBN 978-1-53591415-4

== Portrayals in media ==
- In 1973, a reader's theater production of Bridge of Blood: Jim Elliot Takes Christ to the Aucas was first performed at Tennessee Temple University.
- In 2003, a musical based on the story of Jim and Elisabeth Elliot, entitled Love Above All, was staged at the Victoria Concert Hall in Singapore. This musical was staged a second time, in 2007, at the University Cultural Centre, Singapore.
- In Beyond the Gates of Splendor, a documentary film released in 2002, she appears as herself.
- In the 2006 film End of the Spear, she is portrayed by actress Beth Bailey.
- In 2019, Canadian author Joan Thomas won the Governor General's Award for her book Five Wives, a fictionalized account of Elisabeth Elliot's story.
