= Through Gates of Splendor =

1957 book by Elisabeth Elliot

- First edition
- Author: Elisabeth Elliot
- Language: English
- Genre: missionary life
- Publisher: Harper & Brothers (1st edition); Tyndale House (subsequent editions)
- Publication date: 01.01.1957 (1st ed.); 1975 (2nd ed.); June 3, 1981 (25th anniv. ed.); 1996 (40th anniv. ed.); August 5, 2005 (50th anniv. ed.)
- Publication place: United States
- Pages: 208 (1st ed); 274 (25th anniversary ed.) 303
- ISBN: 0-8423-7152-4
- OCLC: 20746425

Through Gates of Splendor is a 1957 best-selling book written by Elisabeth Elliot. The book tells the story of Operation Auca, an attempt by five American missionaries – Jim Elliot (the author's husband), Pete Flemming, Ed McCully, Nate Saint, and Roger Youderian – to reach the Waorani (variously spelled Waodani or Huaorani, known at the time as Auca) tribe of eastern Ecuador. All five of the men were killed by the tribe.

The title of the book is derived from the fourth stanza of the hymn "We Rest on Thee". This hymn was famously sung by the missionaries before the men left for Waorani territory in September 1955. The lines read:

We rest on Thee, our Shield, and our Defender.
Thine is the battle, Thine shall be the praise;
When passing through the gates of pearly splendor,
Victors, we rest with Thee, through endless days.

Elliot wrote the book while still a missionary in Ecuador. She wrote the book at the request and with cooperation from the families of the five men. She was given copies of letters, and other writings which were extensively quoted from in the book. The original edition of the book was published in 1957, one year before the first peaceful contact with the Waorani was made. In subsequent publications of the book, epilogues have been added to tell about what has happened to the Waorani tribe since Operation Auca, and what has happened to the missionaries' families.

== Films ==
Through Gates of Splendor DVD

In 1967, a documentary film of the same name was produced which included much of the film footage shot by Nate Saint at "Palm Beach". Elisabeth Elliot narrated the film. It was based on Through Gates of Splendor as well as her later book, The Savage My Kinsman.

In 2005 a docudrama was produced, End of the Spear. The film recounts the story of Through Gates of Splendor, but from the perspective of Steve Saint (the son of Nate Saint, one of the missionaries killed in the encounter) as well as from Mincavani, one of the tribesmen who took part in the attack. The two eventually form a bond that continues to this day.

== See also ==
- Beyond the Gates of Splendor
