= Sumatra, Montana =

- Unincorporated community
- Location within Montana Location within the United States
- Coordinates: 46°37′06″N 107°33′04″W
- Country: United States
- State: Montana
- County: Rosebud
- Elevation: 3,202 ft (976 m)
- Time zone: UTC-7 (Mountain (MST))
  - Summer (DST): UTC-6 (MDT)
- ZIP code: 59083
- Area code: 406
- GNIS feature ID: 777301

Sumatra is an unincorporated community in far northwestern Rosebud County, Montana, United States. It consists of a church and a post office, with respective houses, surrounded by open ranch land.

Sumatra was established in 1905 as a station stop, called Summit, on the Milwaukee Road. The town name was changed to Sumatra, after an Indonesian island, with the opening of the post office in 1910.

Roger Youderian born in Sumatra (January 21, 1924 – January 8, 1956) was an American Christian missionary to Ecuador of Armenian descent who, along with four others, was killed while attempting to evangelize the Huaorani people through efforts known as Operation Auca.
