= Readers theater =

Style of theater not using costumes, props, scenery or lighting

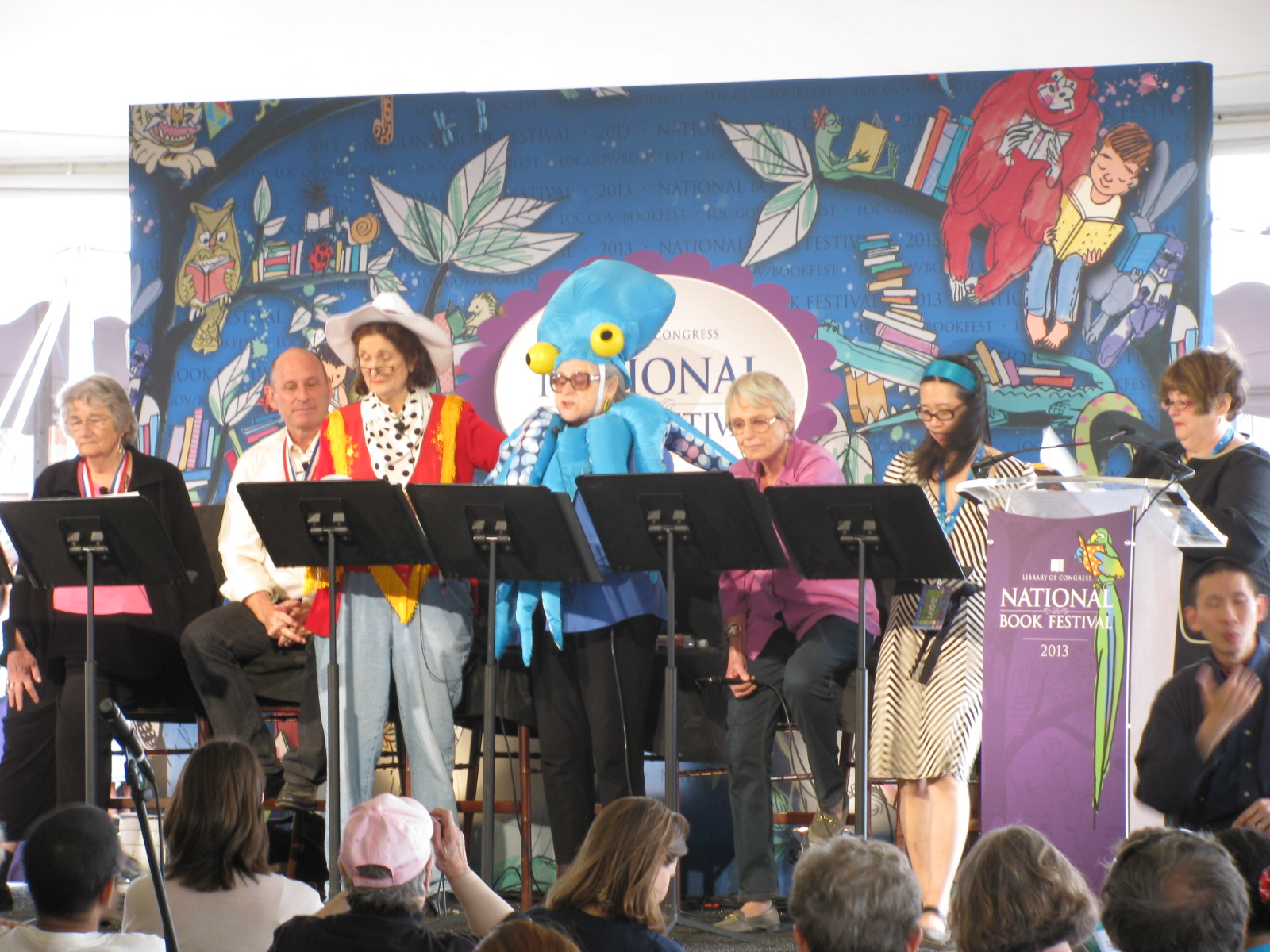
A readers theater performance.

Readers theater is a style of theater in which the actors present dramatic readings of narrative material without costumes, props, scenery, or special lighting. Actors use only scripts and vocal expression to help the audience understand the story. Readers theater is also known as "theater of the mind", "interpreters theater", and "story theater", and performances might be called "reading hours" or "play readings".

== History ==
The form of readers theater is similar to the recitations of epic poetry in fifth–century Greece and public readings in later centuries by Charles Dickens and Mark Twain. Although group dramatic readings had been popular since at least the early 1800s, the first use of the term "readers theater" is attributed to a New York group. In 1945, Eugene O'Neill Jr. and Henry Alsberg established the Readers Theater group, which presented Oedipus Rex at the Majestic Theatre on Broadway.

== Professional readers theater ==
In 1949, a national readers theater tour by the First Drama Quartet—Charles Laughton, Agnes Moorehead, Charles Boyer, and Cedric Hardwicke—appeared in 35 states, putting on 500 performances. Their presentation of Don Juan in Hell was seen by more than a half-million people. Columbia Masterworks recorded a performance, which was later re-released in .mp3 format by Saland Publishing. The Wall Street Journal described it as "No set, no props, just four actors in evening dress seated on stools placed behind music stands, reading Shaw's words out loud." Brooks Atkinson in the New York Times called it "a mighty and moving occasion, not only a performance but an intellectual crusade."

Harris Yulin along with Ed Asner, Rene Auberjonois and Mira Furlan formed the Second Drama Quartet in 1994 and also performed Shaw's Don Juan in Hell. Other actors who participated with the Second Drama Quartet included Gena Rowlands, Dianne Wiest, Harold Gould, David Warner, Martin Landau, and Charles Durning. Yulin said of readers theater, "It's not necessarily a richer experience, but it's a different experience. It's like listening to radio: People's imaginations were engaged in a different way than with television."

Multiple professional productions have made use of readers theater techniques, including the 1967 production of the You're a Good Man, Charlie Brown musical.

== Readers theater in education ==
Six readers from Southwest Missouri State University performed Ray Bradbury's Dandelion Wine at the 1960 Convention of the Speech Association of America. The University of Arkansas began a readers theater program in 1971. The Texas State Junior College Speech tournament in 1975 included a Readers Theater competition. High schools and universities began incorporating readers theater into their drama curriculum, and interpretive readings became a popular competitive event at state, regional, and national forensics tournaments.

In the 1990s, the use of readers theater as a learning strategy spread to elementary and middle schools. Dramatic readings for different subject areas, such as history, science, and sociology, are recommended as a way to engage students, as well as to animate the subjects. Textbook publishers now offer readers theater scripts along with other educational materials.

== Characteristics ==
A key difference between traditional theater and readers theater is that readers theater is not staged or acted out through physical movement. The interpretation of the dramatic reading relies almost entirely on the actors' voices. Although the early readers theater groups used only scripts and stools, the choice to read or memorize and whether to remain seated or allow movement vary according to the desires of the performing group.

Readers theater can dramatize non-dramatic literature, such as a novel or short story or poem, and often includes a "narrator" role which might be a character in the story or a nonparticipating witness.

== See also ==
- Closet drama
- Radio drama
