= Jim Elliot =

American Christian missionary (1927–1956)

- Born: October 8, 1927; Portland, Oregon, U.S.
- Died: January 8, 1956 (aged 28); Curaray River, Ecuador
- Education: Benson Polytechnic H.S. (1941–45); Wheaton College (1945–49)
- Spouse: Elisabeth Elliot
- Children: Valerie Elliot
- Parent(s): Fred Elliot; Clara Elliot

Religious life
- Religion: Christianity
- Church: Plymouth Brethren

Philip James Elliot (October 8, 1927 – January 8, 1956) was an American Christian missionary and one of five people killed during Operation Auca, an attempt to evangelize the Huaorani people of Ecuador.

== Early life ==
Elliot was born in Portland, Oregon, to Fred and Clara Elliot. Fred was of Scottish heritage; his grandparents were the first of his family to settle in North America. Clara's parents moved near the turn of the 20th century from Switzerland to eastern Washington, where they operated a large ranch. They met in Portland, where Clara was studying to be a chiropractor and Fred, having devoted himself to Christian ministry, was working as a traveling preacher with the Plymouth Brethren movement. Robert, their first child, was born in 1921 while they were living in Seattle, and he was followed by Herbert, Jim, and Jane, all three of whom were born after the family moved to Portland. Elliot's parents had firm Christian beliefs, and they raised their children accordingly, taking them to church and reading the Bible regularly. Elliot professed faith in Jesus at the age of six and grew up in a home where obedience and honesty were enforced. The Elliot parents encouraged their children to be adventurous, and encouraged them to "live for Christ".

In 1941, Elliot entered Benson Polytechnic High School, studying architectural drawing. There he participated in numerous activities, including the school newspaper, the wrestling team, school plays, and the public-speaking club. His acting ability led some of the teachers in the school to suggest that he pursue acting as a career, and his oratorical skills were similarly lauded—after Elliot prepared and delivered a speech in honor of President Franklin D. Roosevelt hours after his death in 1945, a faculty member praised it.

Elliot used his speaking ability regularly. A classmate recounts how Elliot quoted the Bible to the president of the student body as an explanation for his refusal to attend a school party. Elliot risked expulsion from the public-speaking club by refusing to give a political speech, believing that Christians were not to involve themselves in politics. A pacifist, he rejected the idea of using force to eliminate slavery in Africa, and he was prepared to stand as a conscientious objector had he been drafted to serve in World War II.

== Leaving for Ecuador ==
In the summer of 1950, while at Camp Wycliffe (Cameron Townsend's linguistics training camp in Oklahoma), Elliot practiced the skills necessary for writing down a language for the first time by working with a former missionary to the Quechua people. The missionary told him of the Huaorani – also called the "Auca", the Quichua word for "savage" – a group of Ecuadorian indigenous people considered violent and dangerous to outsiders. Elliot remained unsure about whether to go to Ecuador or India until July. His parents and friends wondered if he might instead be more effective in youth ministry in the United States, but considering the home church "well-fed", he felt that international missions should take precedence.

After the completion of his linguistic studies, Elliot applied for a passport and began to make plans with his friend Bill Cathers to leave for Ecuador. However, two months later Cathers informed him that he planned to marry, making it impossible for him to accompany Elliot as they had planned. Instead, Elliot spent the winter and spring of 1951 working with his friend Ed McCully in Chester, Illinois, running a radio program, preaching in prisons, holding evangelistic rallies, and teaching Sunday school.

McCully married later that summer, forcing Elliot to look elsewhere for an unmarried man with whom he could begin working in Ecuador. That man turned out to be Pete Fleming, a graduate of the University of Washington with a degree in philosophy. He corresponded frequently with Elliot, and by September he was convinced of his calling to Ecuador. In the meantime, Elliot visited friends on the east coast, including his future wife, Elisabeth Howard. In his journal he expresses hope that they would be able to be married, but at the same time felt that he was called to go to Ecuador without her. Elliot returned to Portland in November and began to prepare to leave the country.

== Ecuador ==
Elliot and Fleming arrived in Ecuador on February 21, 1952, with the purpose of evangelizing the Quechua people. They first stayed in Quito, and then moved to the jungle. They took up residence at a mission station in Shandia. On October 8, 1953, he married fellow Wheaton alumna and missionary Elisabeth Howard. The wedding was a simple civil ceremony held in Quito. Ed and Marilou McCully were the witnesses. The couple took a brief honeymoon to Panama and Costa Rica, then returned to Ecuador. Their only child, Valerie, was born February 27, 1955. While working with the Quechua, Elliot began preparing to reach the Huaorani.

Elliot and his group (Ed McCully, Roger Youderian, Pete Fleming, and their pilot, Nate Saint) made contact with the Huaorani from their Piper PA-14 airplane using a loudspeaker and a basket to pass down gifts. After several months, the men decided to build a base a short distance from a Huaorani village along the Curaray River. There they were approached one time by a small group of Huaorani and even gave an airplane ride to one curious Huaorani whom they called "George" (his real name was Naenkiwi). Encouraged by these friendly encounters, they began plans to visit the Huaorani. Their plans were preempted by the arrival of a group of about 10 Huaorani warriors, who killed Elliot and his four companions on January 8, 1956. Elliot was the first of the five missionaries killed when he and Fleming were greeting two of those attackers. The bodies of the men were found downstream of the camp.

== Legacy ==
Life magazine published a ten-page article on Elliot's and his friends' mission and deaths. After his death, his wife Elisabeth Elliot and other missionaries began working among the Huaorani, where they continued evangelistic work. She published two books, Shadow of the Almighty: The Life and Testament of Jim Elliot and Through Gates of Splendor, which describe the life and death of her husband. In 1991, Jim Elliot Schools was created in Denver, Colorado. In 2004, the school's name was changed to Jim Elliot Christian School. In 1997, the Jim Elliot Christian High School was founded in Lodi, California.

In 2002, a documentary based on the story was released, entitled Beyond the Gates of Splendor. In 2003, a musical based on the story of Jim and Elisabeth Elliot, entitled Love Above All, was staged at the Victoria Concert Hall in Singapore by Mount Carmel Bible-Presbyterian Church. This musical was staged a second time in 2007 at the NUS University Cultural Centre. In 2006, a theatrical movie was released, entitled End of the Spear, based on the story of the pilot, Nate Saint, and the return trip of Saint's son, Steve Saint, attempting to reach the natives of Ecuador.

Elliott James Cominskie, son of renowned Free Will Baptist minister Devin Lyle Cominskie, derives his name from Jim and Elisabeth.

Susan Martins Miller's book Jim Elliot: Missionary to Ecuador quotes Elliot's journal, which he wrote at Wheaton College: "He is no fool who gives what he cannot keep to gain what (Note: A misquotation of Elliot's journal, which originally read "that which".) he cannot lose".

== Videography ==
- Beyond Gates of Splendor (feature film), 2004.
- Torchlighters: The Jim Elliot Story (2005 animation)
- End of the Spear (2006 feature film)
- Steve Saint: The Jungle Missionary (2007 documentary)
