= Pete Fleming =

American Christian missionary (1928 – 1956)

- Olive and Pete Fleming
- Born: November 23, 1928; Seattle, Washington
- Died: January 8, 1956 (aged 27); Curaray River, Ecuador
- Education: University of Washington (1946–1951)
- Occupation: Missionary
- Spouse: Olive Ainslie (m. 1954)
- Parent(s): Kenneth Fleming; Greta Fleming

Peter Sillence Fleming (November 23, 1928 – January 8, 1956) was a Christian who was one of five missionaries killed while participating in Operation Auca, an attempt to evangelize the Huaorani people of Ecuador.

== Early life ==
Fleming was born in Seattle, Washington. At Queen Anne High School, Fleming earned letters in basketball and golf and graduated as valedictorian of his class. He also won a citywide oratorical contest.

In 1946, Fleming entered the University of Washington as a philosophy major. He was very driven in college, working part-time and dedicating much time to prayer and Bible study, as well as keeping up on his classes. He was also elected president of the UCA at his college, and received a master's degree from there in 1951.

Fleming met Jim Elliot during many conferences and mountain climbing expeditions arranged by a large Christian organization. They were good friends and once spent six weeks preaching together across the country. Elliot had a great deal of influence on Fleming and was largely responsible for his becoming a missionary and for his decision to (temporarily) break off his engagement to Olive Ainslie, a childhood friend, so that he might serve without the responsibilities of home life at least for the first year of missionary service.

According to reports, Fleming was speared while desperately trying to speak friendly phrases to the Woadani in the Woadani language as they approached them with weapons. Fleming was the second of the Missionaries to be speared, the youngest in the missionary group at 27 years old and the only of the 5 missionaries without any children.
