= Samuel Fritz =

Czech missionary

The Reverend Samuel Fritz SJ
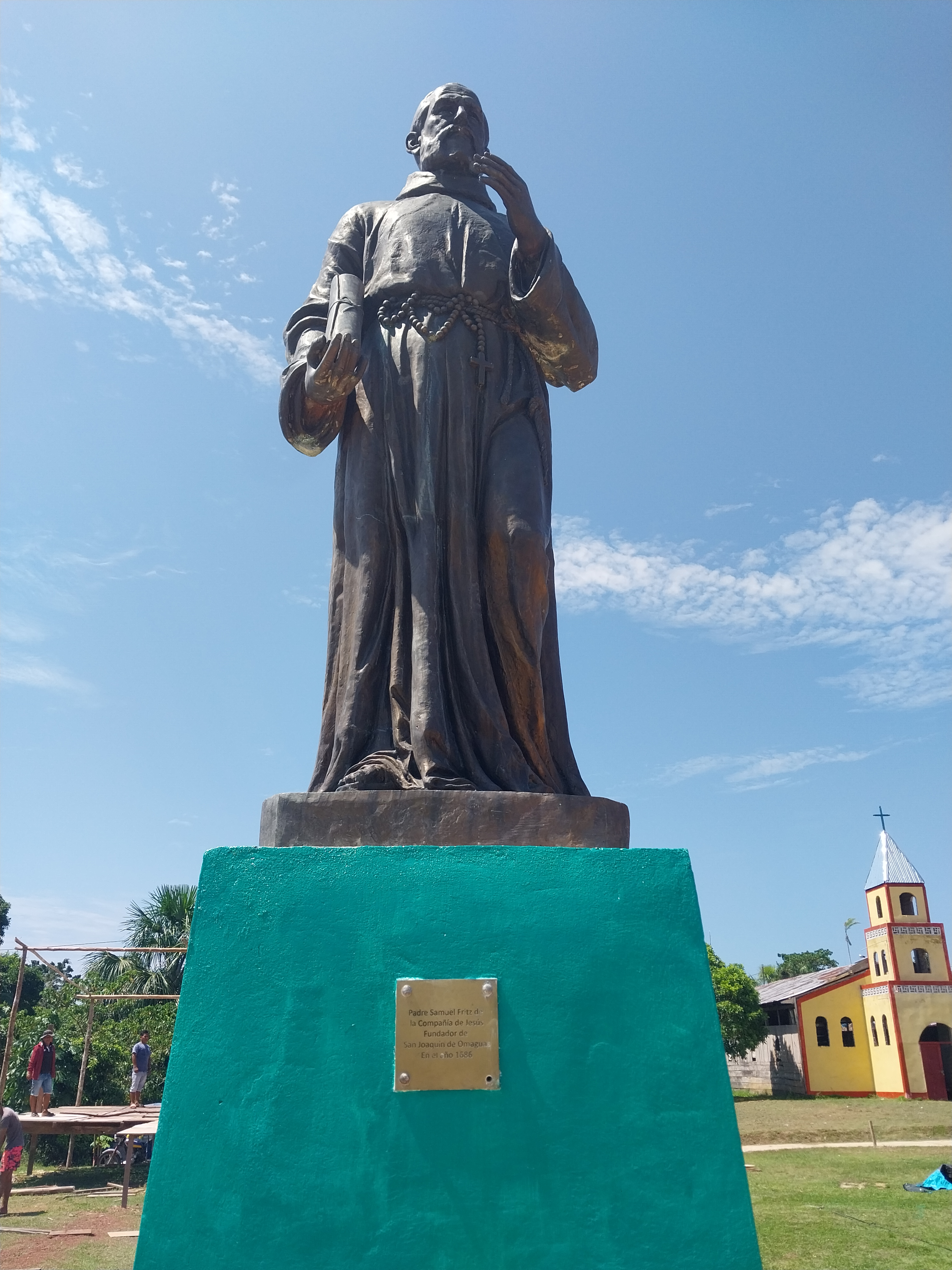
- Statue of Samuel Fritz in the central plaza in Nauta, Peru
- Born: 9 April 1654; Trautenau, Bohemia
- Died: 20 March 1725 or 1730; Jeberos District, Peru
- Education: Charles University in Prague
- Employer: Society of Jesus
- Known for: Creating an early map of the Amazon River

Samuel Fritz SJ (9 April 1654 – 20 March 1725, 1728 or 1730) was a Bohemian Jesuit missionary, noted for his exploration of the Amazon River and its basin. He spent most of his life preaching to Indigenous communities in the western Amazon region, including the Omaguas, the Yurimaguas, the Aisuare, the Ibanomas, and the Ticunas. In 1707 he produced the first accurate map of the Amazon River, establishing as its source the Marañón.

Adept in technical arts and handicrafts, he also was a physician, a painter, a carpenter, a joiner and a linguist skilled at interacting with the Native Americans. He was effective and respected, and helpful to the Viceroyalty of Peru in its boundary dispute with the State of Brazil.

Between 1686 and 1715, he founded thirty-eight missions along the length of the Amazon River, in the country between the Rio Napo and Rio Negro, that were called the Omagua Missions. The most important of these were Nuestra Señora de las Nieves de Yurimaguas, and San Joaquín de Omaguas, which was founded in the first years of Fritz's missionary activities and then moved in January 1695 to the mouth of the Ampiyacu river, near the modern-day town of Pebas in the Peruvian Department of Loreto. These missions were continually attacked by the Brazilian Bandeirantes beginning in the 1690s.

Fritz detailed his early missionary activity among the Omagua people in a set of personal diaries written between 1689 and 1723. Lengthy passages from these diaries were compiled and interspersed with commentary by an anonymous author in the time between Fritz's death and 1738, when they appear in the collection of Pablo Maroni. (Note: The primary source for the history of Samuel Fritz is Noticias auténticas del famoso río Marañón. Written between 1730 and 1738, this text is a compilation of documents, including Fritz's diary. It was published for the first time by Jiménez de la Espada (Boletín de la Sociedad Geográfica de Madrid, 26-32 (1889–1892), who attributed the authorship to Paolo (Pablo) Maroni. In 1892, the complete text of Noticias was published by the Real Academia de la Historia of Madrid, in whose archive it has been preserved. Recently, Jean Pierre Chaumeil coordinated a new edition, which uses the same text published by Jiménez de la Espada.)

== Early life ==
Fritz was born at Trautenau, Bohemia. After studying for a year at the Charles University in Prague, he entered the Society of Jesus as a novice in 1673, and studied mathematics, geodesy and surveying. He taught for several years at the Jesuit seminaries in Uherské Hradiště and Březnice, eventually becoming deputy rector at Brno where he also conducted the student orchestra. He was ordained as a priest on 4 February 1683. In September 1684 he was sent to Quito as a missionary, arriving in Cartagena, Colombia and journeying overland. In 1686 he was assigned to work among the Indians of the Upper Marañon.

== Work with the Omagua people ==
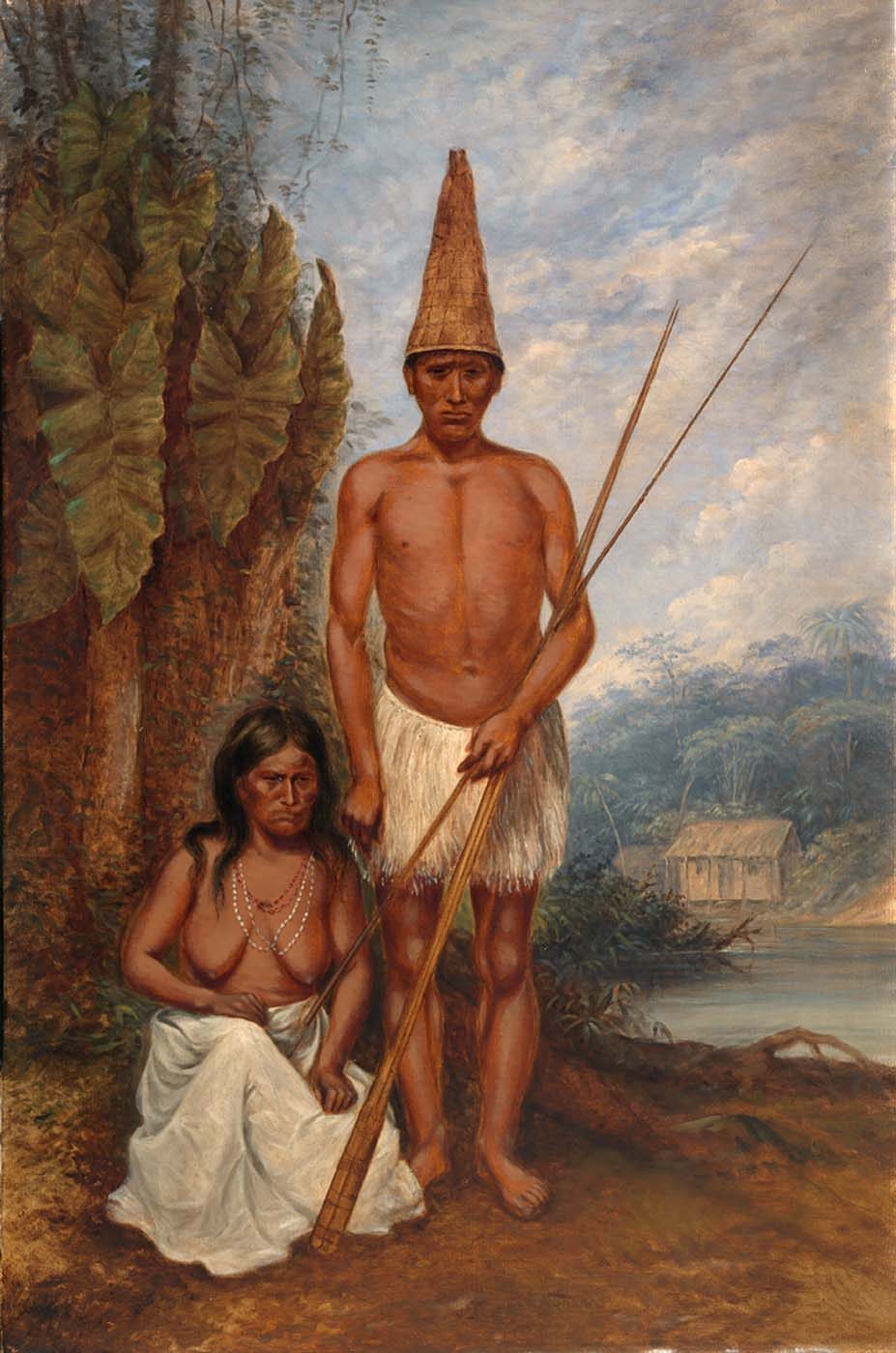
Omagua Indians, by Antonio Zeno Shindler, c. 1893

Fritz established himself among the Omaguas (Omayas or Cambebas) and within a few years had developed his own Omagua catechism in the Omagua language. The Omagua people had requested protection from Portuguese slavers who had begun raiding their communities by the 1680s. When Fritz arrived in their territory in 1686, the Omagua inhabited the islands in the middle of the Amazon River, in a region stretching approximately from the confluence of the Amazon and Napo River to the Juruá River. Towards the end of his first year among the Omaguas, he began a lengthy journey downriver to visit all thirty-eight existing villages, spending two months at each one. He renamed them using the names of patron saints, constructed several rudimentary chapels and baptized mainly children because he found most adults to be insufficiently indoctrinated, as well as "reluctant to give up entirely certain heathen abuses." At the conclusion of this journey, which lasted about three years, he conducted a baptismal ceremony over the entire tribe before returning to San Joaquín de Omaguas. He later concentrated indigenous peoples from different communities into so-called "Jesuit reductions." He also preached intermittently to the Yurimagua, the Aisuare, the Ibanoma and the Ticunas.

== Charting the Amazon ==
At the request of the Real Audiencia of Quito he began in 1687 to delineate the disputed missionary territory on the Upper Marañon between Peru and Quito. In 1689 he undertook, in a primitive pirogue, a daring journey of over 6,000 kilometers down the Amazon to Pará, where he went for medical treatment, probably for malaria. "I fell sick of the most violent attacks of fever and dropsy that began in my feet, and other complaints," he later wrote in an account of his journey. Fritz set off downstream "in the hope of getting some remedy for my sufferings," reaching the mouth of the Rio Negro after three weeks. (Note: Camila Loureiro Dias notes that historians have cast doubt on Fritz's stated motive for his journey, as a sick man could hardly have embarked on such an ambitious voyage into hostile territory, and completed a detailed map of the river in the process. Dias believes that he wanted to produce a map as a means of engaging the attention of the Spanish government so as to obtain support for his missionary activities.)There he met a group of Tupinambarana warriors who escorted him to the Mercedarian mission, where he was treated with bloodletting and therapeutic fumigation, "but instead of being benefitted, I was made worse than before." Fritz was taken by some Portuguese missionaries to the Jesuit College in the city of Pará, but when he felt well enough to return to his mission, he was detained and imprisoned for eighteen months by Artur de Sá Meneses, the Governor of the State of Maranhão, on the accusation of being a Spanish spy. In fact, the Portuguese were concerned that Spanish missions on the Upper Solimões River would lead indigenous communities to support Spain against Portugal. Fritz made use of this time to prepare a map of the river. In 1691, after a complaint was made before the Council of the Indies, his release was authorized by the King of Portugal, who also reprimanded and dismissed the governor. Fritz was accompanied for part of his return journey by a contingent of Portuguese soldiers, with whom he visited fortresses at Gurupá and Tapajós. After leaving Fritz at the mouth of the Coari River in October 1691, the soldiers "cruelly killed very many people and took the rest away as slaves," as Fritz later learned.

Fritz then continued up the Huallaga River to Huánuco, and thence to Lima, returning by way of Jaén to the missions of the Marañón River in February 1692. In Lima he presented his report to the Viceroy Conde de la Monclova Melchor Portocarrero Lasso de la Vega, including a detailed map that he had made of the Amazon region. The Viceroy was so impressed with Fritz's work that he gave him a thousand silver pesos from the treasury and another thousand out of his own pocket for the purchase of "bells, ornaments and other costly articles conducive to the adornment and decent furnishing of his new churches." Nonetheless, the Viceroy told Fritz that he seriously doubted that the production potential of the Amazon forests was sufficient to justify fighting the Portuguese to gain control of it, or even defending any particular outpost.

=== Fritz's maps ===
Fritz's 1707 map showing the Amazon and the Orinoco, on either side of the mythical Lake Parime

Poorly equipped with instruments, Fritz completed a comparatively accurate chart of the course of the Amazon from Belém to Quito. Fritz's maps were the first approximately correct charts of the Marañón territory, and are noteworthy for their relatively precise delineation of the contours and proportions of the South American continent. They were the first to be drawn from personal experience by someone who had navigated the Amazon River from one end to the other. His intention was to obtain military and financial support from the colonial and royal authorities for the development of his missions among the tribes of the frontier.

In all, Fritz produced at least six maps, possibly more, and of these only four have survived. In 1689 he created a draft map of the river during his journey to Pará, presenting this to the governor there. During his imprisonment, he created a second draft of this map on four adjoining sheets of paper, which included the names of indigenous communities, Jesuit reductions, missionary settlements and ethnic groups. Upon arriving in Lima in 1692, he created a larger version of this map to submit to the printer. Difficulties in reproducing this map prevented it from being printed, and a slightly altered version was finally published at Quito in 1707, under the title "The Great River Marañón or Amazonas with the Mission of the Society of Jesus, geographically described by Samuel Fritz, settled missioner on said river." This version is 126 by 46 cm and includes in the legend a detailed description of fauna and flora and indigenous ethnicity on the Amazon. Locations where missionaries were killed are marked with crosses. The original is in the Bibliothèque nationale de France.

Fritz himself felt strongly that his map was far more accurate than other contemporary maps of the Amazon, writing:

"I created this map for a better understanding and general lesson about the great Amazon, or Marañón, with great effort and great work... Although many other maps have appeared today, I want, without touching anyone, to say that none of these maps is accurate because either the measurement on this great river was not attentive or was not done at all, or it was written from the writings of various authors."

A copy of the Quito engraving was sent to Madrid, by order of the Royal Audiencia of Quito, in the care of the procurator from the Jesuit province. But the ship was intercepted by the English, who published the map for the first time in 1712, with modifications and in a reduced scale.

A slightly modified French version was published in 1717 in Paris under the title Cours du fleuve Maragnon autrement dit des Amazones par le P. Samuel Fritz missionaire de la Compagnie de Jésus. In 1726 the map was reproduced in the German-language Jesuit publication Der Neue Welt-Bott. (Augsburg, 1726, I), A revised version, edited by Hermann Moll, was included in the Atlas Geographus in 1732. In 1745 Charles Marie de La Condamine included it in his Relation abrégée d'un voyage fait dans l'intérieur de l'Amérique Méridionale (Paris, 1745), together with a revised chart based on Fritz's map, for comparative study. Among other changes, Condamine added the connection of the Amazon to the Orinoco Basin, which had been discovered following Fritz's death.

A second French version was published in 1781 in Lettres Edifiantes et Curieuses, Écrites des Missions Étrangères, (Paris, 1781).

One prominent error in the map is the inclusion of Lake Parime, of which Fritz knew only through hearsay, and which had been sought unsuccessfully since Sir Walter Raleigh had surmised its existence in 1595. Later explorers concluded that the lake was a myth.

== Indigenous beliefs about Fritz ==
In 1692, upon his return from being held prisoner by the Portuguese, Fritz discovered that an Omagua cult had grown up around claims that he possessed supernatural powers related to curing, rites of passage, and the movement of rivers, and a belief that Fritz himself was immortal. During his absence, in June 1690, a massive earthquake occurred, which was attributed by the Indians to the anger of their deities at Fritz's imprisonment. Rumors also spread that the Portuguese had cut Fritz into pieces, but that he had miraculously reassembled himself. Some of these beliefs, however, portrayed Fritz as evil. Following a solar eclipse in June 1695, an Aisuari chief sent gifts to Fritz with a message begging him not to extinguish the sun. On a more practical note, many of the Indians viewed the presence of Spanish missionaries as protection against the Portuguese, who were subjecting indigenous communities to forced labor. Fritz understood that the Indians viewed him as different from other Europeans—more kindly and patient, less self-serving, and not exploitative, in addition to being very possibly immortal. Once, when talking about the afterlife, he was interrupted by an Aisuari chief who said that Fritz could surely never die, because then there would be no one to serve as their "Father, Lover and Protector."

== Conflict with the Portuguese ==
Starting in 1693, Fritz began working to persuade the Omaguas in San Joaquín de Omaguas to give up their island communities and found new settlements on the nearby banks of the Amazon proper. Fritz wanted larger communities centered around a chapel or a church, and he recommended that these communities be defensible against the Portuguese slavers. In 1695 San Joaquín de Omaguas was relocated to the mouth of the Ampiyacu River in the traditional territory of the Caumaris. Gradually the community grew as people took refuge from the Caumaris and the Mayorunas, the traditional enemies of the Omaguas. Further to the east, Fritz established two other such reductions, San Pablo and Nuestra Señora de Guadalupe.

Soon slave raids launched intermittently from Pará (modern-day Belém) became so intense and frequent that the Omaguas from distant communities, as well as neighboring Yurimaguas, fled to the comparative safety of the Jesuit mission settlements near the mouth of the Napo River, including San Joaquin de Omaguas. This influx of refugees contributed to a deterioration of the relationship between the Jesuits and the longer-term Omagua residents of the mission settlements. Many Omaguas were also leaving the Jesuit missions, tempted by materials and goods being distributed by the Carmelite missions which were competing with the Jesuits for mission converts.

On 10 April 1697, at Nuestra Señora de las Nieves, Fritz met Friar Manoel da Esperança, Vice-Provincial of the Portuguese Carmelites, and a group of Portuguese soldiers who had arrived saying that they intended to take possession of the Upper Solimões. Fritz told them:

"For over eight years I have been in peaceful possession of this mission on behalf of the Crown of Castile. I formed a large part of these heathen Indians into mission settlements, when some were wandering through the forest as fugitives and others living in concealment near the lagoons because of the murders and enslavements they formerly suffered from the men of Pará. I myself, when I was in that city [Belem], saw many slaves from these tribes."

Nonetheless, the Portuguese demanded that Fritz relocate his mission upstream, warning him that if he were caught by the Portuguese in that region, he would be sent to prison in Portugal.

== The Omagua rebellion ==
The process of relocation was difficult. In 1701, Omaguas in several settlements under the leadership of the Omagua cacique Payoreva, rose up against the Jesuit missionary presence, setting fire to the mission and killing some of the Jesuits. Fritz journeyed to Quito to request a small military force to quell the revolt, and subsequently instituted annual visits by secular military forces to intimidate the Omaguas and stave off potential uprisings. Payoreva was arrested, flogged and imprisoned by the Spanish in Borja, however he escaped and returned to San Joaquin de los Omaguas in February 1702 to persuade the Omagua people to leave the influence of the missionaries, and most of the population left to establish new settlements along the Juruá River.

Fritz attempted to persuade the Omaguas to return to the mission and even promised a pardon for Chief Payoreva. The Portuguese Carmelites met with Fritz again several times, negotiating for the rights to unrestricted control over the various tribes. Many of those who followed Payoreva were eventually enslaved by the Portuguese, as was Payoreva himself in 1704.

The influence of the Carmelite missionaries became stronger after a visit by the Portuguese Friar Victoriano Pimentel in 1702. Pimentel discovered quickly that the Amazonians were interested in metal tools and other trade goods and that they could be persuaded to abandon the Jesuits by offerings of "hatchets, sickles, knives, fishhooks, pins, needles, ribbons, mirrors, reliquaries, rings and pieces of wire for their earrings."

== Later life ==
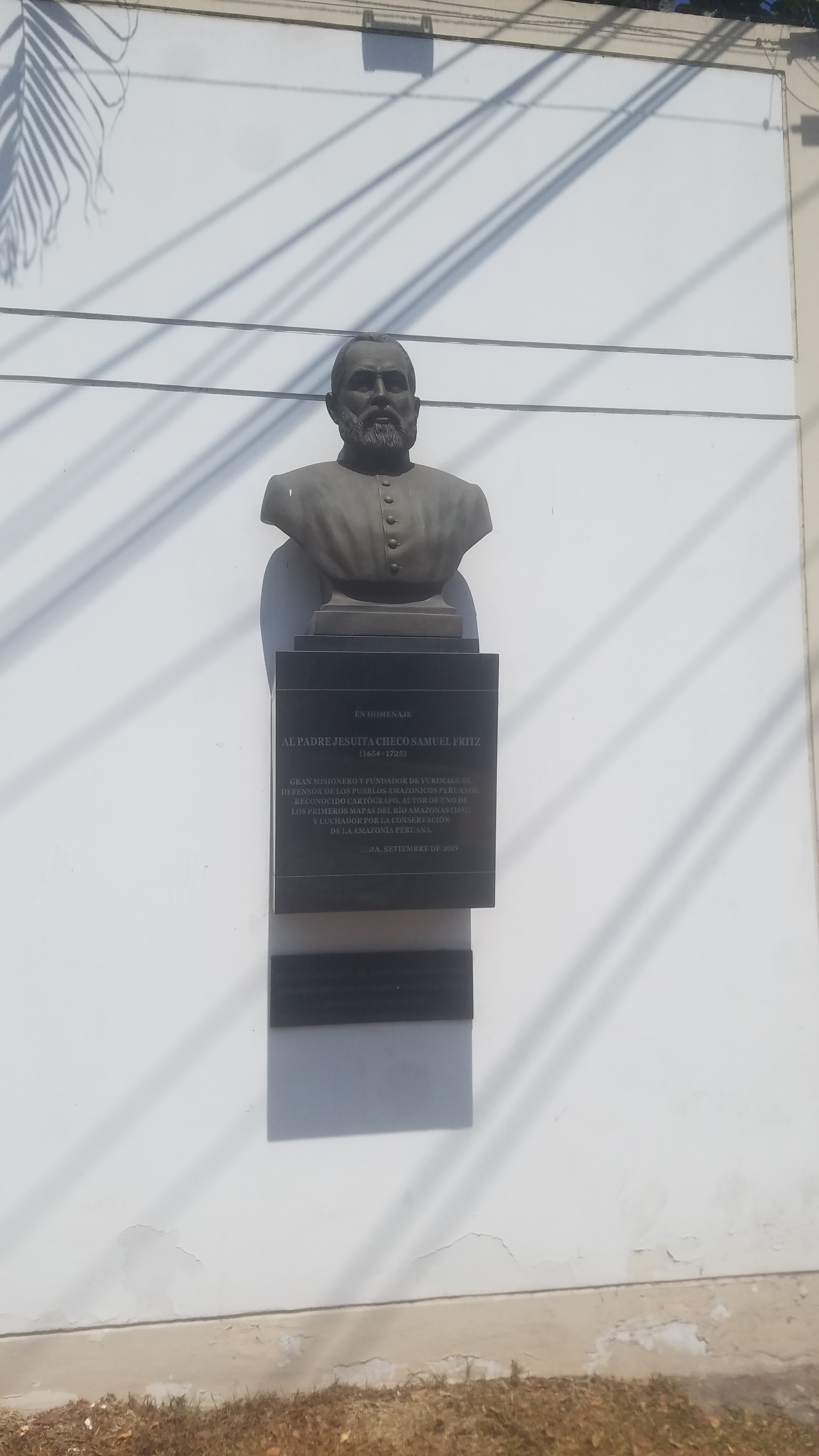
Bust of Samuel Fritz in front of the Czech Embassy in Lima, Peru.

In 1704 Fritz succeeded Gaspar Vidal as Jesuit Superior relocating to Santiago de la Laguna on the Huallaga River. He left responsibility for the Omagua missions to the Sardinian Father Juan Baptista Sanna who had begun working among the Omagua people in 1701. In February 1709, the new king of Portugal, João V, sent a large contingent of Portuguese soldiers to raid the Upper Solimões and to demand the withdrawal of all Spanish missionaries from the region. Fritz wrote to the Portuguese commander begging him to desist, but the Portuguese destroyed several Yurimagua and Omagua communities. Finally, in July, Spanish authorities sent a military force to drive the Portuguese out, burning several Carmelite missions in the process. The Portuguese retaliated in December, killing hundreds of Indians and taking many captives including Juan Baptista Sanna. He was imprisoned in Portugal for a short time and eventually sent on a mission to Japan.

The fighting dispersed nearly all the Yurimagua and Omagua communities, and the survivors were devastated by a smallpox epidemic which began in April 1710 and left the formerly populous region of the Upper Solimões uninhabited. Fritz was replaced as Superior by Gregorio Bobadilla in December 1712, and in January 1714 he began missionary work in Limpia Concepción de Jeberos, where he would live until his death.

The last entry in his diary is dated November 1723. He died some time between 1725 and 1730 (the date is disputed) in a mission village of the Jivaro Indians, attended by a priest named Wilhelm de Tres.

== Legacy ==
In 1870, Johann Eduard Wappäus (1813–1879) wrote of Fritz:

"The great respect justly shown at that time by European scientists for the geographical work of the Jesuits led to the admission into their ranks of Father Fritz by acclamation."

His Amazon map was reprinted in Madrid in 1892, on the occasion of the fourth centenary of the discovery of America. There was another reprint in the Recueil de voyages et de documents pour servir a l'histoire de la géographie. Three of his letters are incorporated in the "N. Welt-Bott" (Augsburg, 1726), III, nos. 24, 25; and according to Condamine, an original report of his travels is to be found in the archives of the Jesuit college at Quito.

Fritz proposed that the Marañón River must be the source of the Amazon River, noting on his 1707 map that the Marañón "has its source on the southern shore of a lake that is called Lauricocha, near Huánuco." Fritz reasoned that the Marañón River is the largest river branch one encounters when journeying upstream, and lies farther to the west than any other tributary of the Amazon. For most of the 18th–19th centuries and into the 20th century, the Marañón River was generally considered the source of the Amazon.

== Sources ==
Attribution

- The entry cites:
  - Carl Platzweg, Lebensbilder deutscher Jesuiten (Paderborn, 1882), 137
  - Anton Huonder, Deutsche Jesuiten Missionäre im 17. u. 18. Jahrhundert (Freiburg, 1889)
  - José Joaquín Borda, Historia de la Compañía de Jesus en la Nueva Granada, Poissy. Imprenta de S. Lejay & C* 1872, Vol. I, 72
  - Chantre y Herrera, Hist. de las Misiones de la C. d. J. en el Marañon Español (Madrid, 1901), VI, ix, 296.
  - Teodoro Wolf, Geografia y Geologia del Ecuador (Leipzig, 1892), 566;
  - Antonio de Ulloa, Relacion historica del viage a la America Meridional hecho de orden de S. Mag. para medir algunos grados de meridiano terrestre y venir por ellos en conocimiento de la verdadera figura y magnitud de la tierra, con otras observaciones astronomicas y phisicas, Jorge Juan, ed. Antonio Marin, Madrid, 1748, I, vi, c. 5.
  - Johann Christoph Adelung, Mithridates oder allgemeine Sprachenkunde: mit dem Vater Unser als Sprachprobe in beynahe fünfhundert Sprachen und Mundarten., (Berlin, 1806), III, ii, 611. "The linguistic abilities of Samuel Fritz."
