= Huallaga River Boats Collision (2021) =

Boats Collision in Peru

Huallaga river boats collision
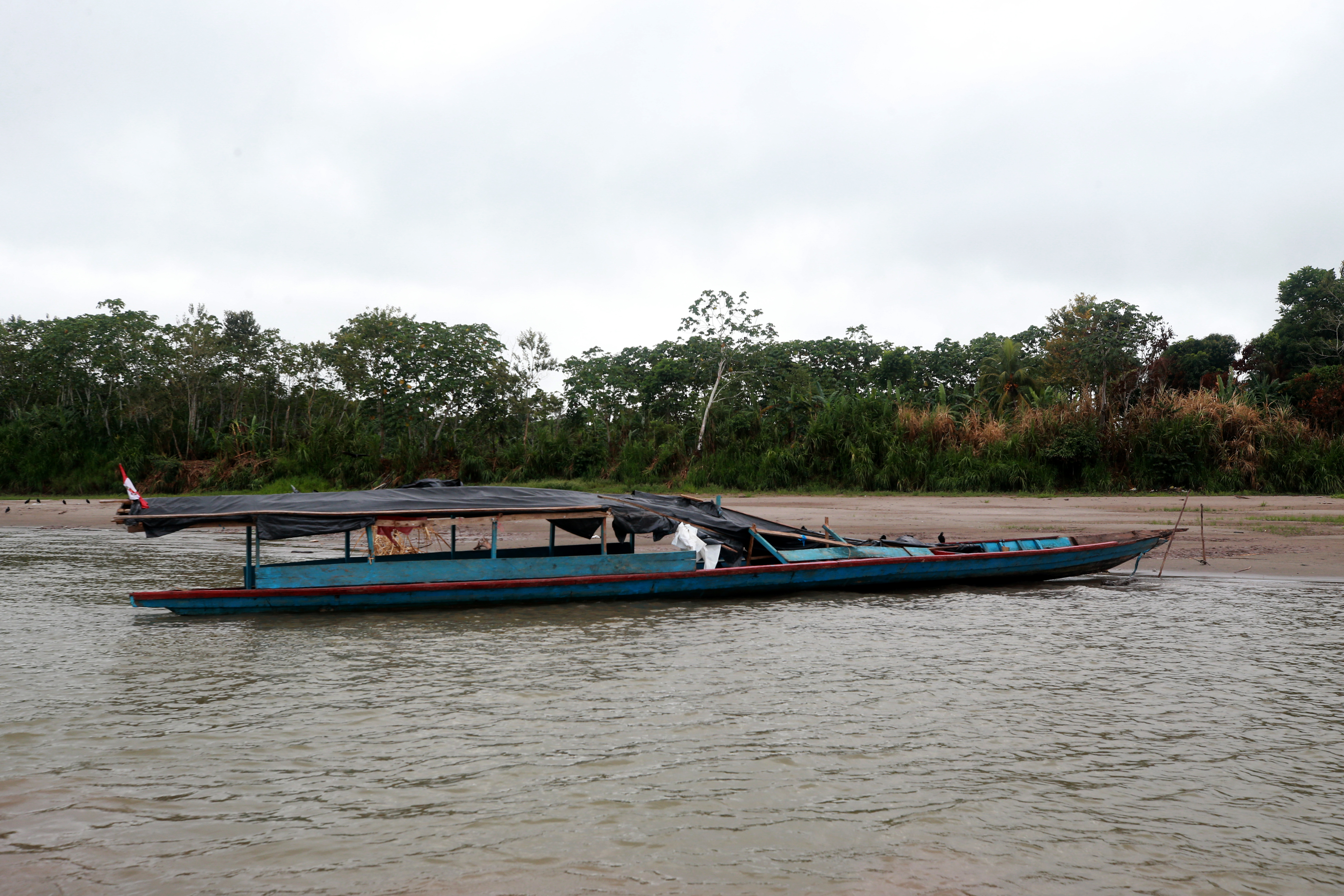
- Ayachi boat the day after the collision
- Date: 29 August 2021
- Time: 5:30 a.m.
- Location: Huallaga River, Yurimaguas, Loreto, Peru
- Cause: Collision
- Outcome: 21 deceased; 23+ missing; 60 survivors

The Huallaga river boats collision was a fatal boat collision that killed 21 in Peru. It occurred on August 29, 2021, in the Alto Amazonas Province, west of the Department of Loreto. An additional unknown number of people were described as missing.

== Description ==
The event occurred in the early morning of August 29 in the Alto Amazonas Province, when a motorized ferry collided with a river boat. The boat had approximately 80 people on board. Intense morning fog made it difficult to see.

Petroperú reported that the 80-person boat was called Ayachi, and the motor boat Nauta. Ayachi picked up its passengers at 1:00 a.m. in Santa María to transfer them to Yurimaguas, while Nauta headed for Iquitos. Ayachi's passengers belonged to an evangelical congregation called Nueva Jesuralén.

== Rescue ==
At the time of the accident, smaller boats of locals came to rescue the survivors. A passenger from Ayachi relates:

"Some grabbed us from behind, desperate. We were under the boat. We have managed to get out. My colleagues don't. I have lost my wife and seven-year-old son."

Rescuers from the Peruvian National Police and the Peruvian Navy went to the scene, where they managed to rescue 50 people alive. At the beginning, 16 were reported missing.

The number of survivors rose to 60, and the number of deceased increased to 23 on August 31. One family was reported to have 14 deaths in the accident.
