= Víctor Isla =

Peruvian lawyer, businessman and politician

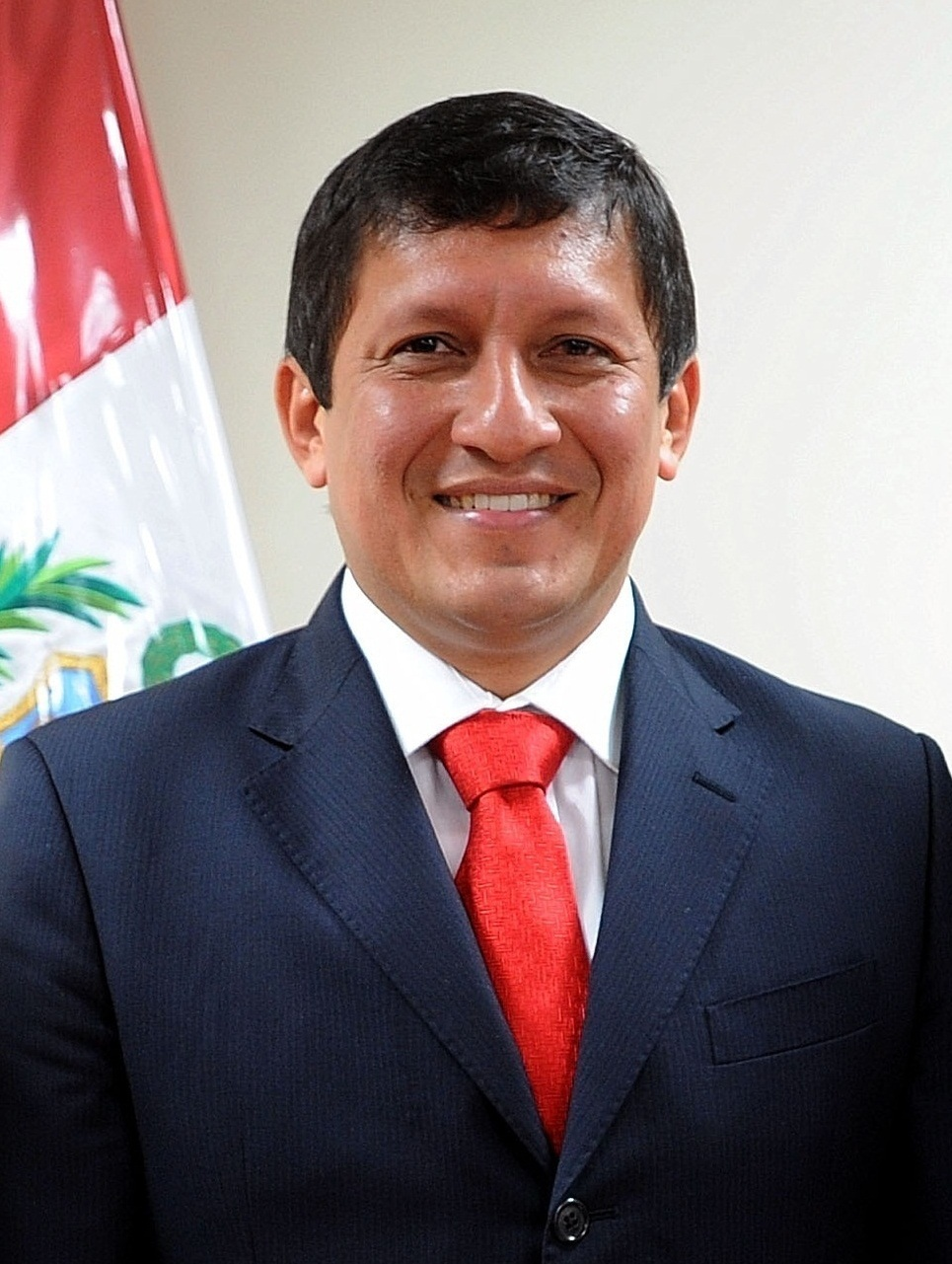

President of Congress
- In office 26 July 2012 – 26 July 2013
- Vice President: 1st Vice President; Marco Falconí; 2nd Vice President; Juan Carlos Eguren; 3rd Vice President; José Luna
- Preceded by: Daniel Abugattás
- Succeeded by: Fredy Otárola

Member of Congress
- In office 26 July 2006 – 26 July 2016
- Constituency: Loreto

1st Lieutenant Governor of Loreto
- In office 1 January 2003 – 26 July 2006
- Governor: Robinson Rivadeneyra
- Preceded by: Position established
- Succeeded by: Norman Lewis de Alcázar

Provincial Councilor
- In office 1 January 1999 – 31 December 2002
- Constituency: Alto Amazonas

Personal details
- Born: Víctor Isla Rojas; 7 August 1968 (age 58) Santa Cruz, Peru
- Party: Podemos Perú (2018-present)
- Other political affiliations: Peruvian Nationalist Party (2006–2016); Peru Wins (2010-2012); Union for Peru (2006); We Are Peru (1998-2000s)
- Education: National University of San Marcos
- Occupation: Politician
- Profession: Lawyer, businessman

Víctor Isla Rojas (born 7 August 1968) is a Peruvian lawyer, businessman and politician. He was a former Congressman representing the Loreto region for two terms, from 2006 to 2016 and was President of the Congress between 2012 and 2013. Before he became a congressman, he was the Vice Governor of Loreto serving between 2003 and 2006 and served as Provincial Councillor of Alto Amazonas.

== Early life, education and career ==
He was born in the district of Santa Cruz in the province of Alto Amazonas, Department of Loreto, Peru, on August 7, 1968, the son of Víctor Isla del Águila and Elena Rojas. He attended his primary and secondary studies in the city of Yurimaguas. From 1986 to 1992, Víctor Isla studied law and political science at the National University of San Marcos in Lima. From 1994 to 2002 he worked as an independent lawyer and outside adviser.

== Political career ==
=== Early political career ===
In the 1998 municipal elections, he was elected provincial councilor in his home province of Alto Amazonas under the We Are Peru party of Lima’s charismatic Mayor Alberto Andrade. In the 2002 regional elections, he was elected Vice Governor of the Loreto Region.

=== Congressman ===
In the 2006 election, he was elected Congressman on the joint Union for Peru-Peruvian Nationalist Party list, representing the Loreto Region for the 2006–2011 term and after the elections, the alliance split and Isla sat on the Nationalist bench in Congress. Isla later returned to his alma mater to take a postgraduate course in constitutional and human rights laws from 2008 to 2009. In the 2011 election, he was reelected for the 2011–2016 term, this time on the Nationalist-dominated Peru Wins list. He was President of the Congress in 2012 for the annual 2012-2013 term.

=== Post-congressional career ===
In the 2018 regional elections, he ran for Regional Governor of Loreto under the newly established Podemos Perú party, but was not elected, receiving only 1.6% of the vote in the election.

== Controversies ==
Isla has been linked to the government of Hugo Chávez, and to the Casa del Alba project in Peru. In that sense, even the political partner of the then Peruvian president Ollanta Humala, former Peruvian president Alejandro Toledo, expressed doubts about his candidacy for the presidency of the Congress. Isla was finally elected president of the congress for the period 2012-2013. Likewise, Isla was elected in 2006 as a congressman for Loreto; However, he did not gain prominence until it was revealed that he hired Martín Reátegui, a former member of the Shining Path, as an advisor.
