= Cognate =

Words inherited by different languages

Diagram showing relationships between etymologically related words

In historical linguistics, cognates or lexical cognates are sets of words that have been inherited in direct descent from an etymological ancestor in a common parent language.

Because language change can have radical effects on both the sound and the meaning of a word, cognates may not be obvious, and it often takes rigorous study of historical sources and the application of the comparative method to establish whether lexemes are cognate. It can also happen that words that appear similar, or identical, in different languages, are not cognate.

Cognates are distinguished from loanwords, where a word has been borrowed from another language.

== Name ==
The English term cognate derives from Latin cognatus, meaning "blood relative".

== Examples ==
For an example, cognates with the English word night can be found in most major Indo-European languages, including German Nacht, Swedish natt, Ukrainian ніч nich, Russian ночь noch, Lithuanian naktis, Welsh nos, Polish noc, Greek νύχτα nychta, Sanskrit नक्त nakt-, Albanian natë, Latin nox (gen. sg. noctis), Italian notte, French nuit, and Portuguese noite. These all mean 'night', and derive from the Proto-Indo-European *nókʷts with the same meaning. The Indo-European languages have hundreds of such cognate sets, though few of them are as neat as this.

The Arabic سلام salām, the Hebrew שלום shalom, the Assyrian Neo-Aramaic ܫܠܡܐ shlama and Amharic ሰላም selam 'peace' are cognates, derived from the Proto-Semitic *šalām- 'peace'.

The Paraguayan Guarani panambi, the Eastern Bolivian Guarani panapana, the Cocama and Omagua panama, and the Sirionó ana ana are cognates, derived from the Old Tupi panapana 'butterfly', maintaining their original meaning in these Tupi languages. Brazilian Portuguese panapanã (flock of butterflies in flight) is a borrowing rather than a cognate of the other words.

== Characteristics ==
Cognates need not have the same meaning, as they may have undergone semantic change as the languages developed independently. For example English starve and Dutch sterven 'to die' descend from the same Proto-Germanic verb, *sterbaną 'to die', but the English word has experienced a semantic narrowing and refers only to death by malnutrition.

Cognates also do not need to look or sound similar: English father, French père, and Armenian հայր (hayr) all descend directly from Proto-Indo-European *ph₂tḗr. An extreme case is Armenian երկու (erku) and English two, which descend from Proto-Indo-European dwóh₁; the sound change *dw > erk in Armenian is regular.

Paradigms of conjugations or declensions, the correspondence of which cannot be generally due to chance, have often been used in cognacy assessment. However, beyond paradigms, morphosyntax is often excluded in the assessment of cognacy between words, mainly because structures are usually seen as more subject to borrowing. Still, very complex, non-trivial morphosyntactic structures can occasionally take precedence over phonetic shapes to indicate cognates. For instance, Tangut, the language of the Xixia Empire, and one Horpa language spoken today in Sichuan, Geshiza, both display a verbal alternation indicating tense, obeying the same morphosyntactic collocational restrictions. Even without regular phonetic correspondences between the stems of the two languages, the cognatic structures indicate secondary cognacy for the stems.

== False cognates ==
False cognates are pairs of words that appear to have a common origin but which in fact do not. For example, Latin habēre and German haben both mean 'to have' and are phonetically similar. However, the words evolved from different Proto-Indo-European (PIE) roots: haben, like English have, comes from PIE *kh₂pyé- 'to grasp', and has the Latin cognate capere 'to seize, grasp, capture'. Habēre, on the other hand, is from PIE *gʰabʰ 'to give, to receive' and hence cognate with English give and German geben.

Likewise, English much and Spanish mucho look similar and have a similar meaning, but are not cognates: much is from Proto-Germanic *mikilaz < PIE *meǵ- and mucho is from Latin multum < PIE *mel-. A true cognate of much is the archaic Spanish maño 'big'.

== Distinctions ==
Cognates are distinguished from other kinds of relationships.

- Loanwords are words borrowed from one language into another; for example, English beef is borrowed from Old French boef ('ox’). Although they are part of a single etymological stemma, they are not cognates.
- Doublets are pairs of words in the same language that are derived from a single etymon, which may have similar but distinct meanings and uses. Often, one is a loanword and the other is the native form, or they have developed in different dialects and then found themselves together in a modern standard language. For example, Old French boef is cognate with English cow, so English cow and beef are doublets.
- Translations, or semantic equivalents, are words in two different languages that have similar or practically identical meanings. They may be cognate, but usually they are not. For example, the German equivalent of the English word cow is Kuh, which is also cognate, but the French equivalent is vache, which is unrelated.

== Related terms ==
=== Etymon (ancestor word) and descendant words ===
An etymon, or ancestor word, is the ultimate source word from which one or more cognates derive. In other words, it is the source of related words in different languages. For example, the etymon of both Welsh ceffyl and Irish capall is the Proto-Celtic *kaballos (all meaning horse).

Descendants are words inherited across a language barrier, coming from a particular etymon in an ancestor language. These words very often undergo phonetic erosion over time, a process which is much less deliberate and conscious than is morphological derivation (described below). For example, Russian мо́ре and Polish morze are both descendants of Proto-Slavic *moře ('sea').

=== Root and derivatives ===
A root is the source of related words within a single language (no language barrier is crossed).

Similar to the distinction between etymon and root, a nuanced distinction can sometimes be made between a descendant and a derivative.

A derivative is one of the words that have their source in a root word and were at some time created from the root word using morphological constructs such as suffixes, prefixes, and slight changes to the vowels or to the consonants of the root word. For example unhappy, happily, and unhappily are all derivatives of the root word happy.

The terms root and derivative are used in the analysis of morphological derivation within a language in studies that are not concerned with historical linguistics and that do not cross the language barrier.

== See also ==
- Homology (biology)
- Indo-European vocabulary
- False friend
- False etymology
- Folk etymology
- Word family
