= Omagua people =

Indigenous ethnic group of the Amazon Basin

Omagua Kambeba
umawa
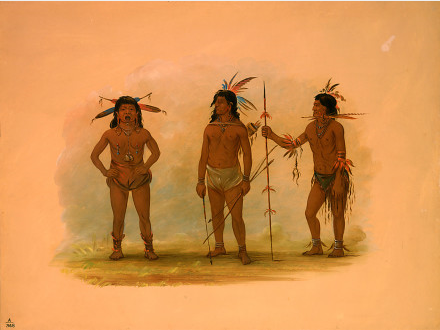
- Three Omagua men, painted by George Catlin between 1854 and 1872.

Total population
- 5000 (2002)

Regions with significant populations
- Brazil, Peru

Languages
- Omagua language

The Omagua people (also known as the Umawa, Cambeba, and Kambeba) are an Indigenous people in Brazil's Amazon Basin. Their territory, when first in contact with Spanish explorers in the 16th century, was on the Amazon River upstream from the present-day city of Manaus extending into Peru. They speak the Omagua language. The Omagua exist today in small numbers, but they were a populous, organized society in the late Pre-Columbian era. Their population suffered steep decline, mostly from infectious diseases, in the early years of the Columbian Exchange. During the 18th century, the Omagua largely abandoned their Indigenous identity in response to prejudice and racism that marginalized aboriginal peoples in Brazil and Peru. More tolerant attitudes led to a renewed tribal identity starting in the 1980s.

The name Cambeba seems to have been applied by other neighboring tribes and refers to the Omagua custom of flattening their children's heads by binding a piece of wood to the forehead soon after birth. Omagua women would jeer at the women from other tribes, saying that their heads were "round like those of forest savages." In the 18th century, the Omaguas would point out to travelers that their flattened foreheads were a sign of cultural superiority over their neighbors, and for a long time they resisted abandoning this custom, even under missionary pressure.

== Pre-Columbian era ==
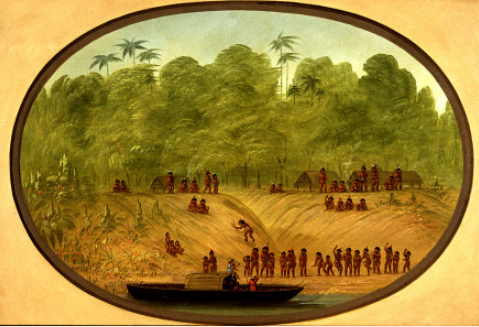
An Omagua village, painted by George Catlin between 1854 and 1872.

Recent archaeological work has revealed evidence of semi-domesticated orchards, as well as vast areas of land enriched with terra preta. Both of these discoveries, along with Cambeba ceramics discovered within the same archaeological levels, suggest that a large and organized civilization existed in the area prior to European contact. There is also evidence for complex large-scale, pre-Columbian social formations, including chiefdoms, in many areas of Amazonia (particularly the inter-fluvial regions) and even large towns and cities. Amazonians may have used terra preta to make the land suitable for the large-scale agriculture needed to support dense populations and complex social formations such as chiefdoms.

== Earliest European contact ==
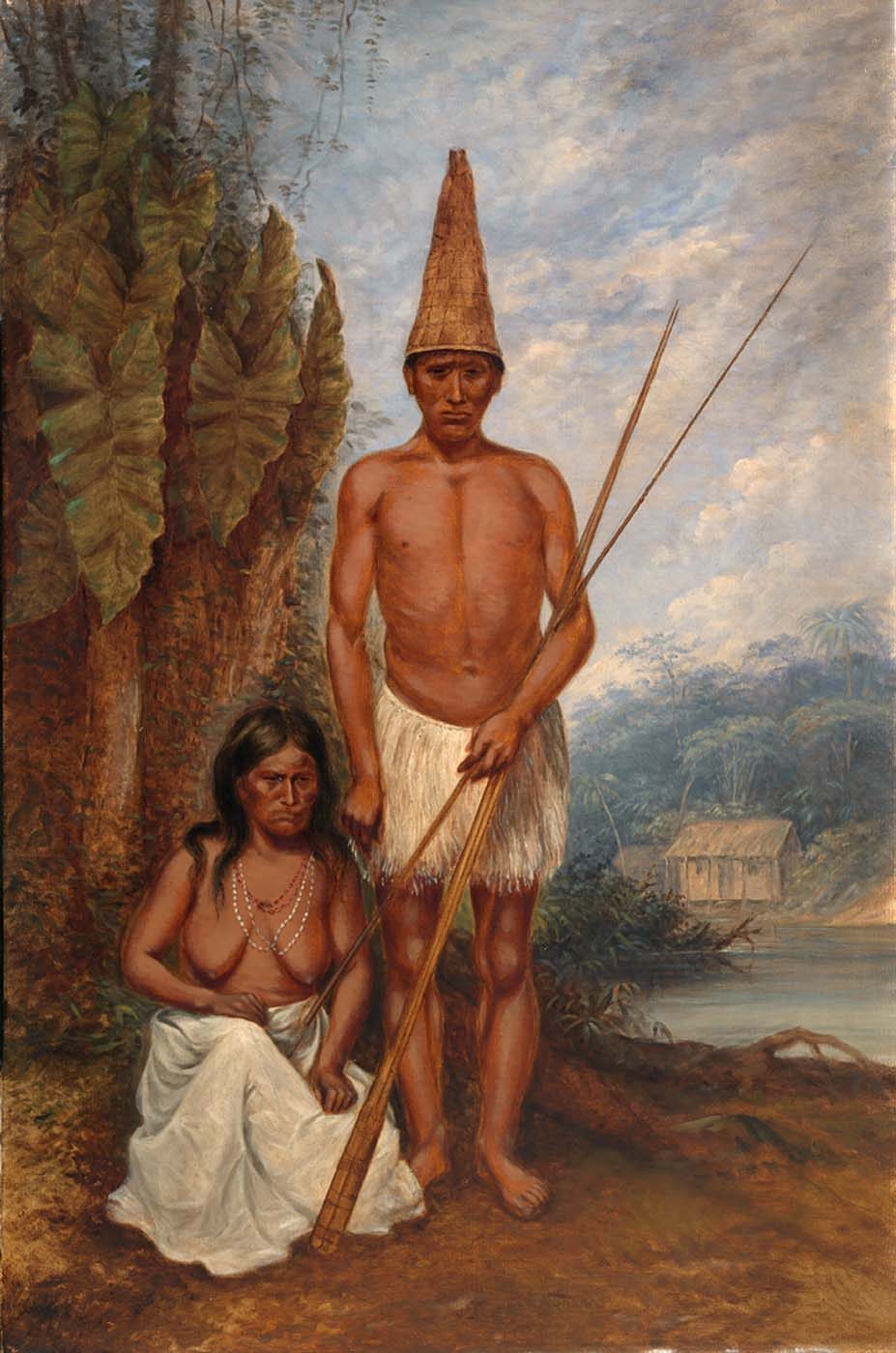
Omagua Indians, by Antonio Zeno Shindler, c. 1893

Fabulous stories about the wealth of the Cambeba and the search for El Dorado led to several early expeditions into their country, including those of Georg von Speyer in 1536, of Philipp von Hutten in 1541 and of Pedro de Ursúa in 1560. In 1541 Hutten led an exploring party of about 150 men, mostly horsemen, from Coro on the coast of Venezuela into the Llanos, where they engaged in battle with a large number of Cambebas and Hutten was severely wounded. In 1560 Pedro de Ursúa even took the title of Governador del Dorado y de Omagua. Alexander von Humboldt referred to the supposed location of the mythical golden city, "El Dorado de las Omaguas", as being "between the sources of the Rio Negro, of the Uaupes (Guape), and of the Jupura or Caqueta."

The Spanish explorer Francisco de Orellana, who was the first European to navigate the full length of the Amazon River (1541–42), reported densely populated regions running hundreds of kilometers along the river, although the people there left no lasting monuments, possibly because they used local wood as their construction material. While it is possible Orellana may have exaggerated the level of development among the Amazonians, their semi-nomadic descendants are distinguished by having a hereditary yet landless aristocracy, a historical anomaly for a society without a sedentary, agrarian culture. This suggests they once were more settled and agrarian but became nomadic after the demographic collapse of the 16th and 17th century, due to European-introduced diseases such as smallpox and influenza, while still maintaining certain traditions. Moreover, many indigenous people adapted to a more mobile lifestyle in order to escape colonialism. This might have made the benefits of terra preta, such as its self-renewing capacity, less attractive—farmers would not have been able to employ the renewed soil as they migrated for safety.

Gaspar de Carvajal, who accompanied Orellana, included a description of the Omaguas in his 1542 work Relación del nuevo descubrimiento del famoso río Grande que descubrió por muy gran ventura el capitán Francisco de Orellana ("Account of the recent discovery of the famous Grand river which was discovered by great good fortune by Captain Francisco de Orellana"), discussing their culture, diet, housing, settlement patterns and political structure. Cristóbal de Acuña, who accompanied Pedro Teixeira's 1637-38 expedition along the length of the Amazon, commented extensively on the colorful woven clothing used by the Omaguas, writing that

...all of them go about decently dressed, both the men and women, who weave...not only the clothes they need but also other items traded with their neighbors...they make very beautiful cloth, either woven in different colours or painted so perfectly that it is almost impossible to distinguish between them...

Most early chroniclers remarked on the Omagua practice of flattening the head, a practice common among indigenous South American tribes. Acuña described it in his Nuevo descubrimiento del gran Rio de las Amazonas:

All of them have flat heads, which makes the men ugly-looking, though the women disguise the fact more since their heads are covered with abundant hair. The natives are so accustomed to having their heads flattened that as soon as children are born, there are put in a press where the forehead is compressed with a small board and the skull by a much larger board, which, acting as a cot, supports the entire body of the newborn...they end up with the forehead and skull flattened like the palm of the hand...looking more like a deformed bishop’s mitre than the head of a person.

The practice of head-flattening evidently died out towards the end of the eighteenth century. Later visitors to the region, including Ouvidor Sampaio and Alexandre Rodrigues Ferreira were told that the practice was intended to distinguish the Cambeba from other tribes that continued to eat human flesh long after the Cambeba had abandoned this practice. Pedro Teixeira remarked in 1639 that "they are very savage people and though all those living along the river are savage and eat each other, the Kambeba are unsurpassed since they eat nothing other than human meat and use the skulls of those they kill as trophies."

=== Population estimates ===
The Cambeba (Omagua) were described by Europeans of the sixteenth and seventeenth centuries as the largest and most important of the various nations that inhabited the banks of the Amazon River. In addition to their high population density, the Cambeba were noteworthy for their advanced level of sociopolitical organization. They were a sedentary, civic-minded people who wore clothing and had an identifiable political authority; they also were involved in military conflicts with tribes from the interior, whose prisoners of war were incorporated into Cambeba society as domestic servants.

John Hemming, modern historian, explorer, and expert on the indigenous populations of the Amazon, estimates that on the year 1500, the Omagua had a population of approximately 60,000, being the most populous tribe along upper portions of the Amazon River within Brazil.

In 1639, Pedro Teixeira observed over 400 Cambeba villages between the Javary River and the Jutaí River, but fifty years later Samuel Fritz found only 38 villages, many of them located on islands as a means of self-defense. A smallpox epidemic in 1648 lasted three months and may have killed up to one third of the population. A second epidemic in 1710 came during a period of warfare. Modern estimates of Cambeba population size at contact range from a very conservative 4,000-7,000, to a credible 91,000.

Samuel Fritz and other missionaries began concentrating the scattered indigenous communities into Jesuit reductions in order to facilitate religious indoctrination and protect them from enslavement by the Portuguese, but smallpox devastated the population, leaving the region of the upper Solimões uninhabited. In 1745, Charles Marie de La Condamine wrote in his Relation abrégée d'un voyage fait dans l'intérieur de l'Amérique Méridionale, that of the 30 Omagua villages marked on Fritz's 1707 map, he saw only ruins, adding that "all the inhabitants, frightened by the incursions of a group of bandits from Pará, who came to enslave them in their own lands, dispersed into the forest and the Spanish and Portuguese missions". Throughout the eighteenth century and until slavery was officially outlawed in Brazil in 1888, forced labor programs destroyed indigenous communities, compelling the natives to abandon their ethnic traditions and adopt the identity of caboclos (settlers of mixed race). By the late 1980s, it was assumed by many ethnographers such as Betty Jane Meggers that the Cambeba were extinct.

Modern-day populations are divided between Peru and Brazil. In 1994 there were approximately 3,500 Omaguas living in the area near Nauta, Peru. In Brazil, Omaguas live in several villages on the middle and upper Solimões in Amazonas, in lands predominately occupied by the Ticunas, with smaller groups in Manaus, including the doctor and shaman Adana Omágua Kambeba. The Brazilian population is estimated to be around 1,500 people, but an official 2002 census identified only 325 individuals, possibly due to poor census techniques and because those Cambebas living on the Ticuna reservation were counted as Ticunas.

=== Linguistic controversy ===
Some linguists argue that the Omagua language is derived from Tupi-Guarani and became a distinct language in relatively recent times, however there is evidence that Omagua and the closely related Kokama language already existed in a form similar to their modern forms by the time European missionaries arrived in Maynas in the 17th century.

The use of the language has declined due to schooling of young people, and Cambeba is spoken fluently only by tribal elders on formal occasions, in meetings and in some school classes.

== Early Jesuit missions ==
Missionary interactions with the Cambebas began with an expedition led by the Jesuits Simón de Rojas and Umberto Coronado to the Upper Napo River in 1620. The expedition spent almost a year with the Cambebas of the Aguarico River area, and by virtue of a bilingual Quechua-Cambeba translator, produced a number of ecclesiastical texts in Omagua, including a catechism.

In 1647, Spanish Franciscan friar Laureano de la Cruz left Quito with a company of other friars in hopes of converting the Omagua. Instead, the friars were disappointed to find themselves among the Omagua at the peak of a smallpox epidemic. They observed the death of a large portion of the tribe, the depopulation of many villages, and the overall disintegration of the tribe morale. Friar Laureano was among the Omagua for three years. During this time he estimated that there were 34 standing villages, containing a total population of at most 5,000 people.

In 1687, Samuel Fritz (1654-1725) arrived to begin work converting the Cambeba to Christianity and within a few years had developed his own Cambeba catechism. When Fritz arrived in their territory, the Cambeba inhabited the islands in the middle of the Amazon River, in a region stretching approximately from the confluence of the Amazon and Napo River to the Juruá River. Towards the end of his first year among the Omaguas, he began a lengthy journey downriver to visit all thirty-eight existing villages, spending two months at each one. He renamed them using the names of patron saints, constructed several rudimentary chapels and baptized mainly children because he found most adults to be insufficiently indoctrinated, as well as "reluctant to give up entirely certain heathen abuses." At the conclusion of this journey, which lasted about three years, he conducted a baptismal ceremony over the entire tribe before returning to San Joaquín de Omaguas. He later concentrated indigenous peoples from forty different localities into so-called "Jesuit reductions."

=== Cultural observations of Samuel Fritz ===
Much of what is known about the Cambeba people was written by Samuel Fritz during the 38 years that he lived in the Amazon. Fritz described Omagua men as unusually "talkative and proud" in comparison with other Amazonian Indians. They were universally acknowledged to be the best canoemen on the river. They wore beautiful multi-colored cotton clothing including "breeches and shirts of cotton," while women wore "two pieces of the same kind, one of which serves them for a small apron, the other to form an indifferent covering for the breasts." Both men and women painted great portions of their bodies, faces and even their hair with the "juice, darker than mulberry, of a forest fruit called jagua." The Omaguas told Fritz with remarkable candor that before becoming Christians, they had enjoyed a kind of polity and government; many of them living a sociable life, showing a satisfactory subjection and obedience to their principal caciques, and treating everyone, men and women alike, with a certain consideration.

According to Fritz, when Omagua girls reached puberty, they would be hung up in hammocks "within an awning fixed to the top of the house," and kept there for a month with nothing but a little water and dry farinha for their sustenance and some cotton to keep themselves busy by spinning. At the end of that ordeal, they were taken down and carried to the river, washed from head to foot, painted from the face down to the middle of the body, and then sent home naked to be adorned with feathers and celebrated in their new womanhood by the entire community with music and dancing. During these ceremonies, the other women would give them small quantities of manioc beer to drink; finally, the oldest man in the village would come up and strike them on the shoulders with a small stick, giving them at the same time the names they would bear for the rest of their lives. After undergoing this ritual, the men were allowed to ask for them as wives.

The Omaguas harvested their crops from the island mud-flats as well as from their swiddens; and they stored manioc underground in ingeniously designed pits, to be protected from the flood and then eaten during the next planting season. They hung up maize and other fruits of the soil in the high parts of their houses for preservation. When the floods came, they were ready for it on elevated bark floors in their tall houses, and used their canoes for all movement from one place to another. They fought and hunted only with the lance, blowgun and boquetera, a sling discharging hard clay bullets used to kill the manatee, the river turtle and the enormous pirarucú fish.

== The Cambeba rebellion of 1701 ==
By the 1690s, Portuguese slave raids launched intermittently from Pará (modern-day Belém) became so intense and frequent that the Cambeba from distant communities, as well as neighboring Yurimagua, fled to the comparative safety of the Spanish Jesuit mission settlements near the mouth of the Napo River, including San Joaquin de Omaguas. This influx of refugees contributed to a deterioration of the relationship between the Jesuits and the longer-term Cambeba residents of the mission settlements.

In 1701, Cambebas in several settlements rose up against the Jesuit missionary presence, under the leadership of the Cambeba cacique Payoreva. At Fritz's request, a small military force quelled the revolt, and Fritz subsequently instituted annual visits by secular military forces to intimidate the Cambeba and stave off potential uprisings. Payoreva was arrested and imprisoned by the Spanish, however he escaped and returned to San Joaquin de Omaguas to persuade the Omagua people to leave the influence of the missionaries and establish new settlements along the Juruá River. Fritz attempted to persuade the Cambebas to return to the mission and even promised a pardon for Chief Payoreva. Many of those who followed Payoreva were eventually enslaved by the Portuguese, as was Payoreva himself in 1704. That same year Fritz was appointed Jesuit Superior and responsibility for the Omagua missions was handed over to the Sardinian Juan Baptista Sanna, who had begun working among the Omagua in 1701.

== Destruction of indigenous communities ==
In February 1709, the new king of Portugal, João V, sent a large contingent of Portuguese soldiers to raid the Upper Solimões and to demand the withdrawal of all Spanish missionaries from the region. Fritz wrote to the Portuguese commander begging him to desist, but the Portuguese destroyed several Yurimagua and Cambeba communities. Finally, in July, Spanish authorities sent a military force to drive the Portuguese out, burning several Carmelite missions in the process. In 1710 the Portuguese sent more troops into the region, leading Sanna to attempt to relocate the populations of San Joaquin de Omaguas and the neighboring San Pablo to the safer location of Yarapa, on the lower Ucayali River. However, the Portuguese arrived in the midst of this relocation, killing many Omaguas, and capturing others, as well as taking Sanna prisoner. He was held in Portugal for a short time and eventually sent on a mission to Japan.

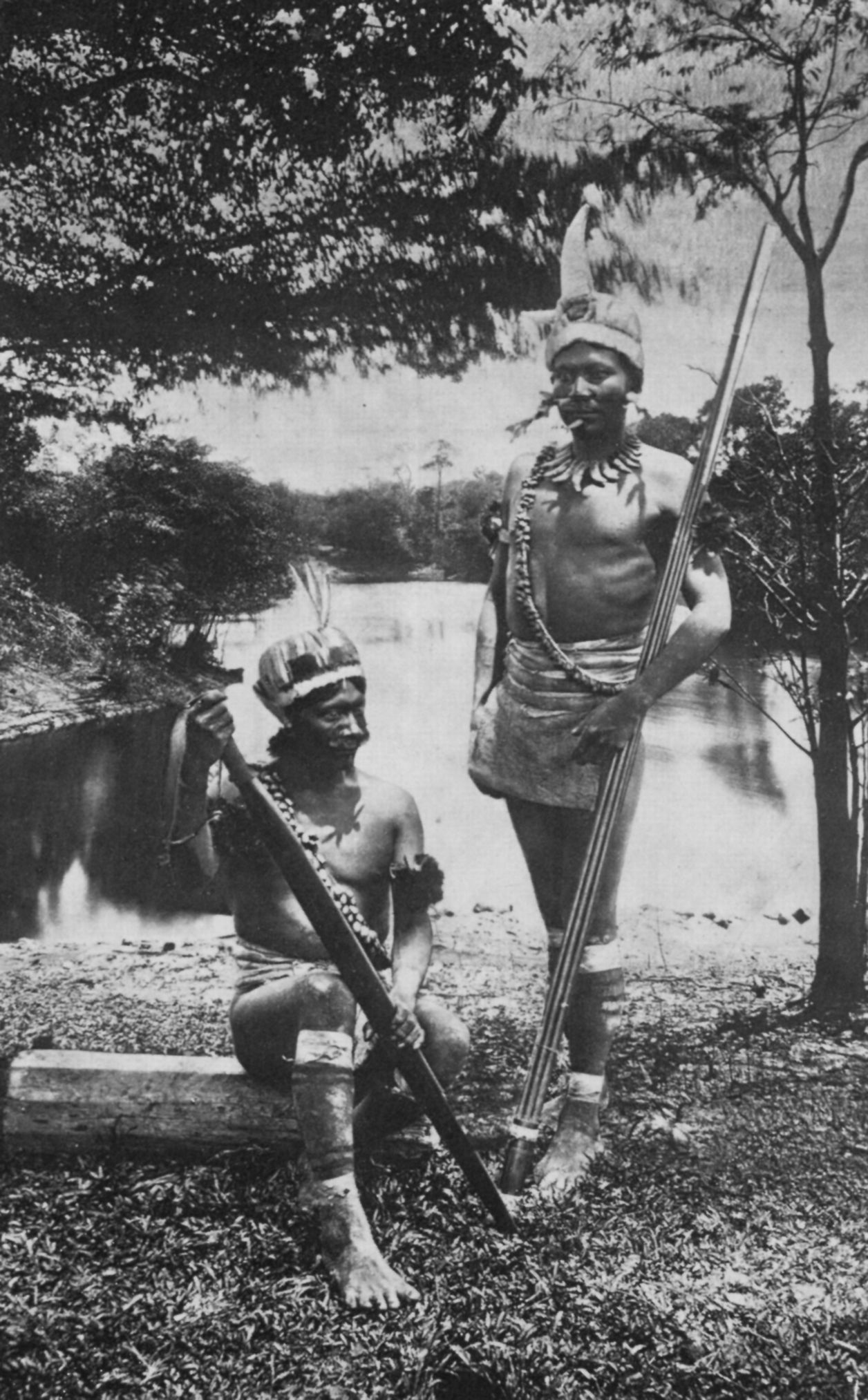
Omagua Indians near the Japurá River, 1865. Photograph by Albert Frisch.

The fighting dispersed nearly all the communities of the Yurimaguas and the Cambebas, and the survivors were devastated by an epidemic which began in April 1710 and left the formerly populous region of the Upper Solimões uninhabited. Jesuit activity among the Cambeba ceased until July 1723, when Bernard Zurmühlen and Johannes Baptist Julian arrived to found a new mission. Zurmühlen remained with the Cambebas until 1726, and San Joaquin de Omaguas became the principal center for missionary activity in the lowland regions of Maynas until the Portuguese expulsion of the Jesuits in 1767.

== The Cabanagem Revolt ==
Infectious disease, slavery and forced labor took their toll on Cambeba population and culture throughout the 18th century. The Cabanagem Revolt (1835–40), in which slave-hunters were killed and plantations burned, led to a resurgence of ethnic identity among indigenous peoples in Brazil, however by the 1850s new controls under the Indian Directorate system, plus new forced labor programs set up to further the extraction of rubber, discouraged Cambeba traditions and culture.

== See also ==
- Marajoara culture
- Population history of indigenous peoples of the Americas
- Samuel Fritz
