= Lagunas District, Alto Amazonas =

Coordinates: 5.2358°S 75.6787°W

Lagunas District
- District
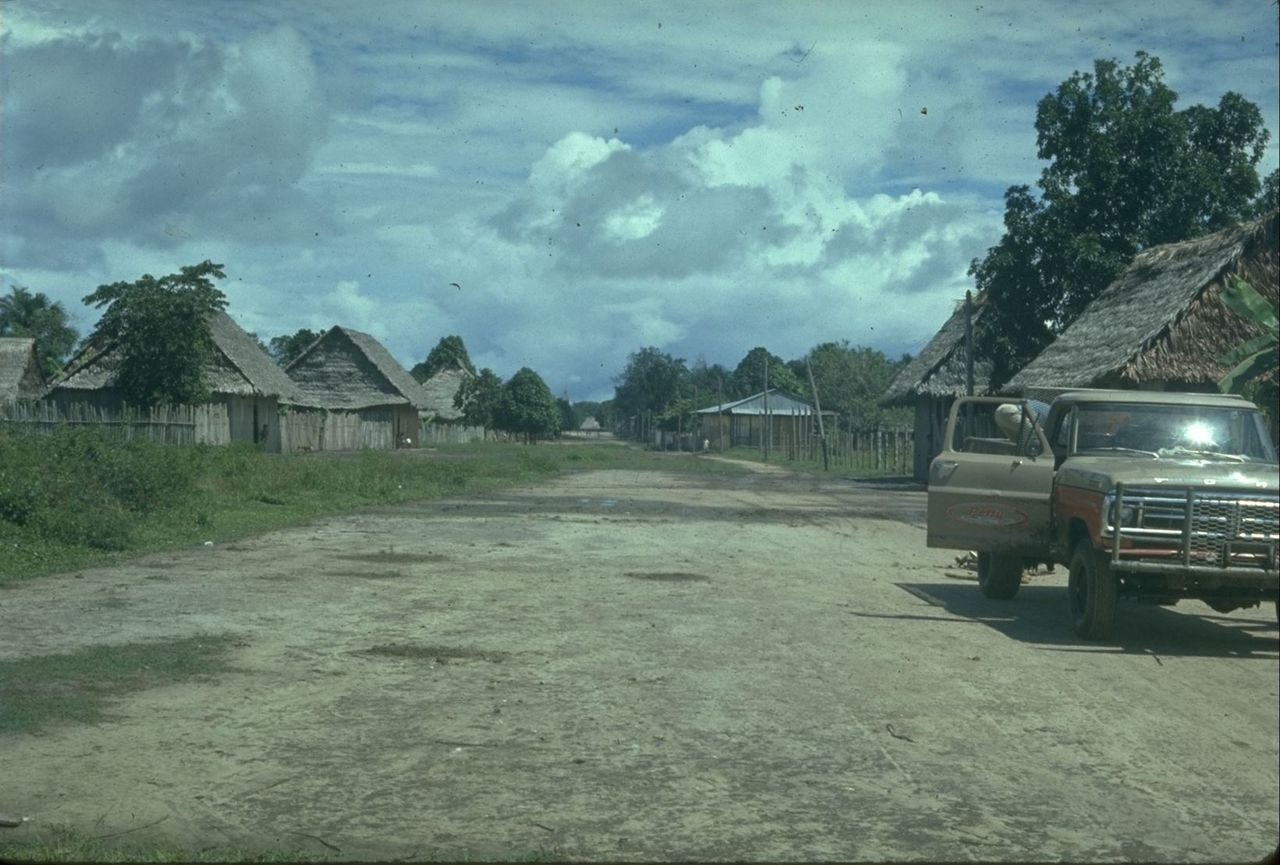
- Main Street in Lagunas City in the Lagunas District of the Alto Amazonas Province, in the Department of Loreto, in Peru. This photo was taken in 1971 while working as a Geophysical Observer in oil exploration for Petty Geophysical.
- Interactive map of Lagunas District
- Country: Peru
- Region: Loreto
- Province: Alto Amazonas
- Founded: January 2, 1857
- Capital: Lagunas

Government
  - Mayor: Rider Padilla Sinarahua

Area
  - Total: 6,086.29 km^{2} (2,349.93 sq mi)
- Elevation: 149 m (489 ft)

Population (2005 census)
  - Total: 12,827
  - Density: 2.1075/km^{2} (5.4585/sq mi)
- Time zone: UTC-5 (PET)
- UBIGEO: 160206

Lagunas District is one of the six districts of the Alto Amazonas Province, in the Department of Loreto, in Peru. It is bordered by the districts of Alto Pastaza, Pastaza, Jeberos, Santa Cruz, Urarinas and Parinari.

The capital, Lagunas, sits on the Huallaga River. The nearest road access is in Yurimaguas, situated 90 km (56 miles) to the south. To reach Yurimaguas by boat takes at least five hours.

== History ==
The settlement of Santiago de Lagunas was established in 1670 by a priest, Juan Lorenzo Lucero.

== Human Geography ==
Lagunas District is home to members of the Kokama and Chayahuita indigenous groups.

== Tourism ==
Lagunas is located 12 km (7.5 miles) from Ranger Station 8 (PV8) of the Pacaya-Samiria National Reserve. It is therefore a starting point to explore the north-western section of the Reserve.

== Gallery ==
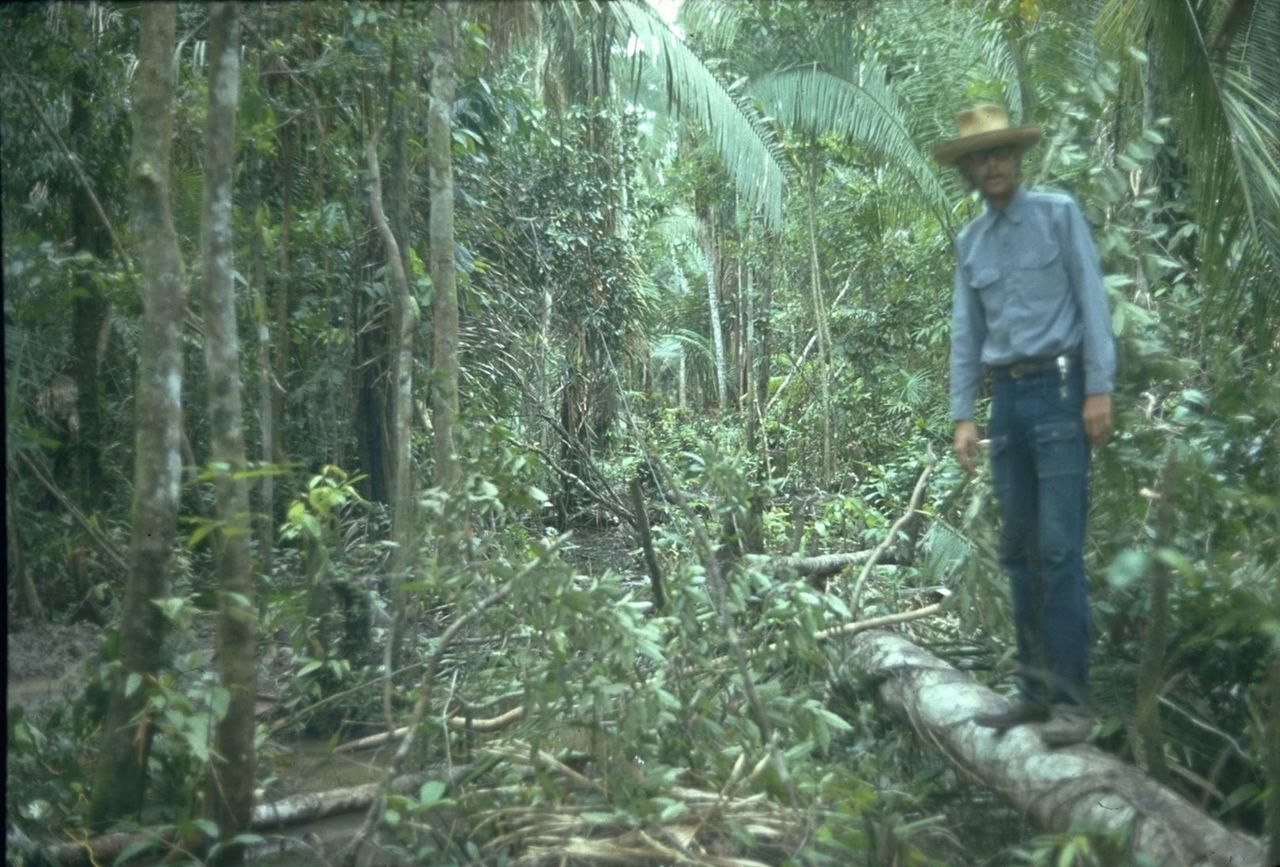
Photo of the Amazon jungle in the Lagunas District of the Alto Amazonas Province, in the Department of Loreto, in Peru. This photo was taken in 1971 while working as a Geophysical Observer in oil exploration for Petty Geophysical.

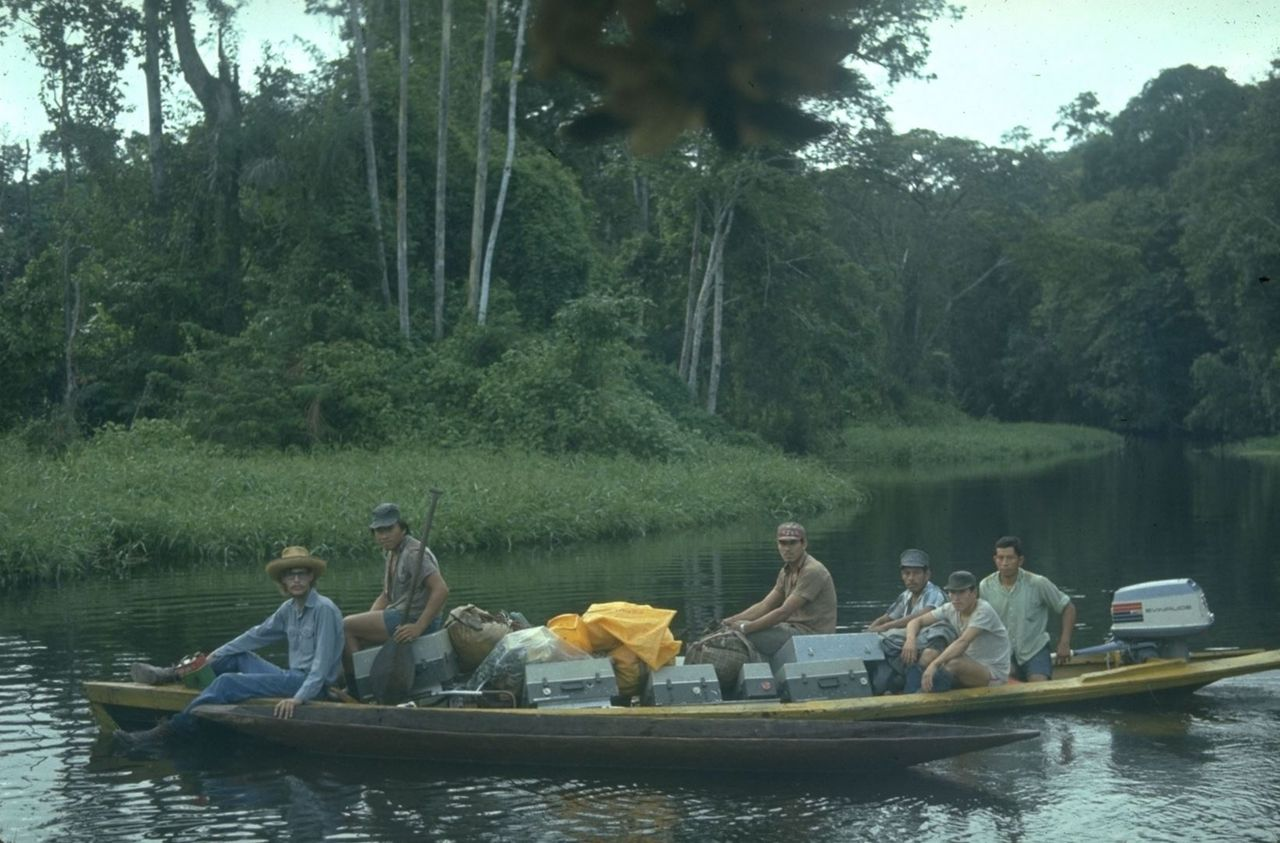
Photo of the Amazon jungle in the Lagunas District of the Alto Amazonas Province, in the Department of Loreto, in Peru. This photo was taken in 1971 while working as a Geophysical Observer in oil exploration for Petty Geophysical.

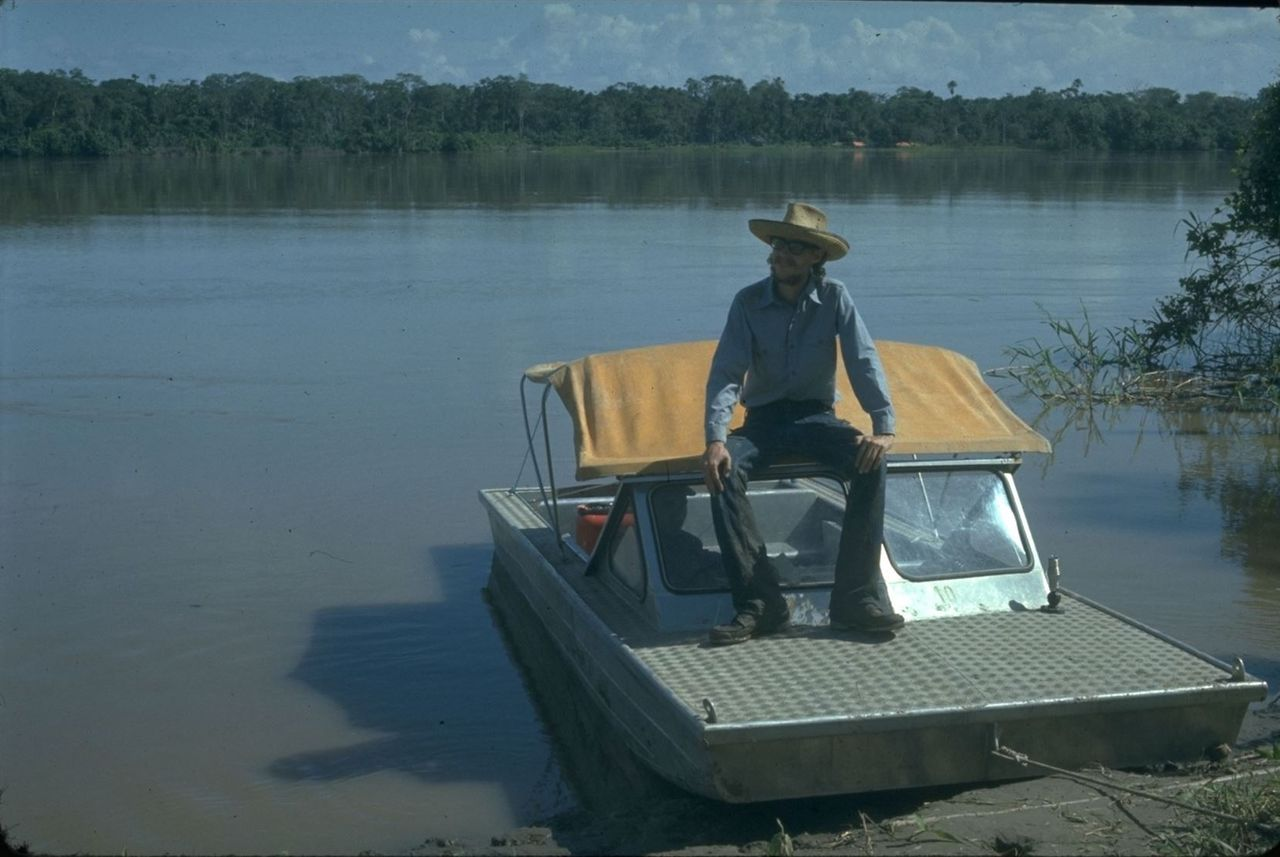
Photo of the Amazon jungle in the Lagunas District of the Alto Amazonas Province, in the Department of Loreto, in Peru. This photo was taken in 1971 while working as a Geophysical Observer in oil exploration for Petty Geophysical.

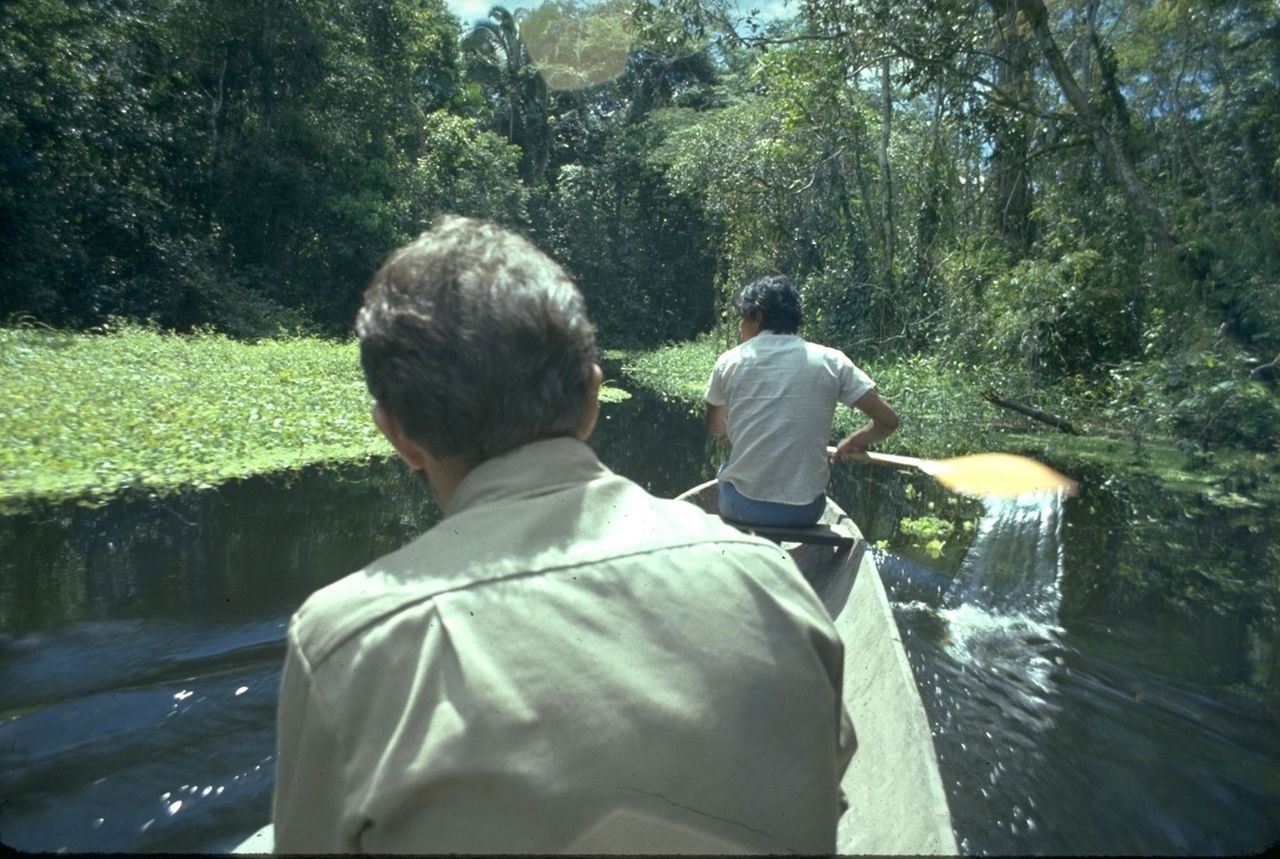
Photo of the Amazon jungle in the Lagunas District of the Alto Amazonas Province, in the Department of Loreto, in Peru. This photo was taken in 1971 while working as a Geophysical Observer in oil exploration for Petty Geophysical.

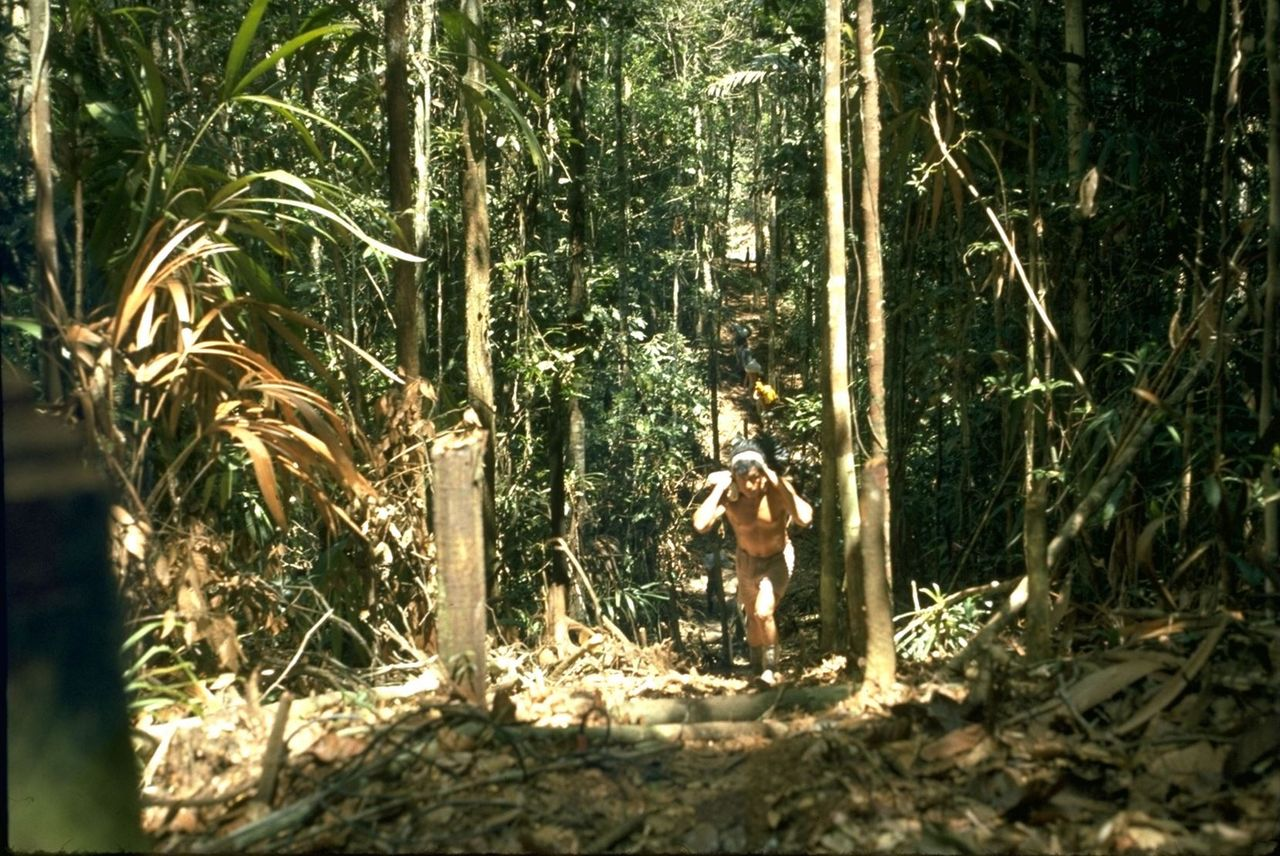
Photo of the Amazon jungle in the Lagunas District of the Alto Amazonas Province, in the Department of Loreto, in Peru. This photo was taken in 1971 while working as a Geophysical Observer in oil exploration for Petty Geophysical.

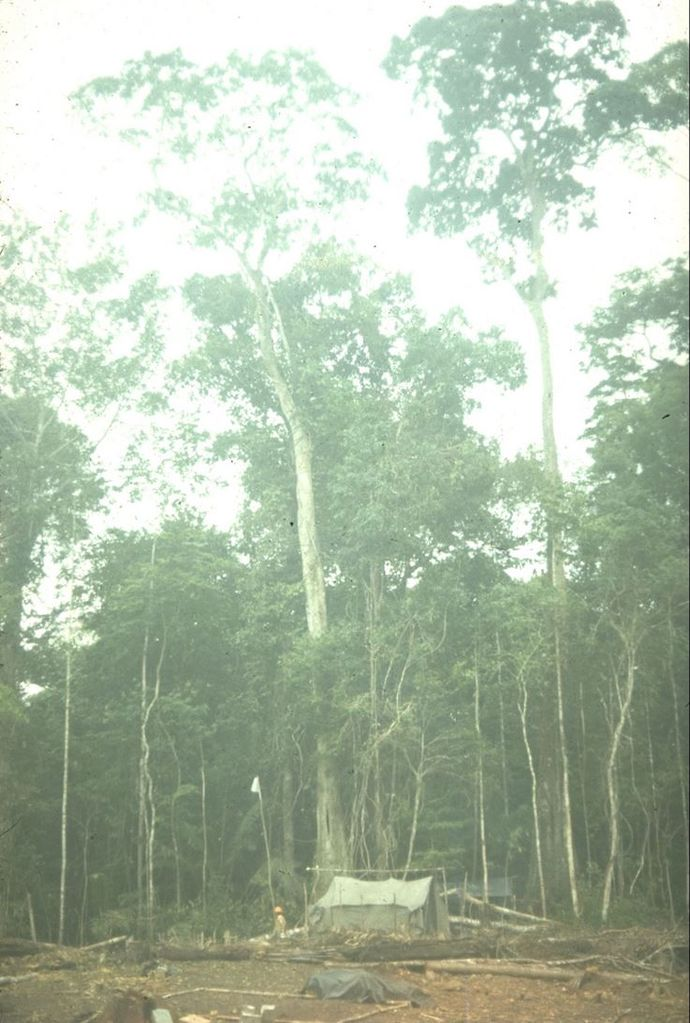
Photo of the Amazon jungle in the Lagunas District of the Alto Amazonas Province, in the Department of Loreto, in Peru. This photo was taken in 1971 while working as a Geophysical Observer in oil exploration for Petty Geophysical.

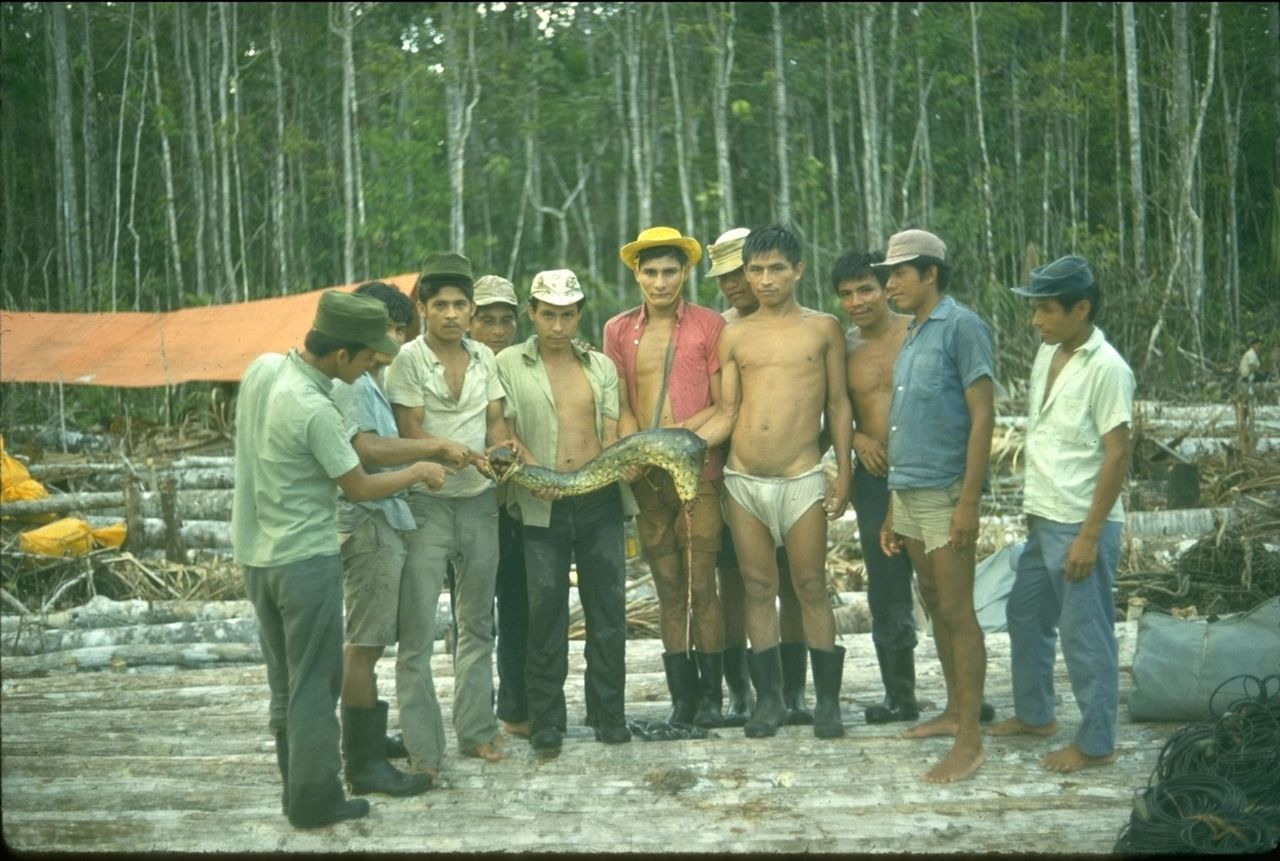
Photo of the Amazon jungle in the Lagunas District of the Alto Amazonas Province, in the Department of Loreto, in Peru. This photo was taken in 1971 while working as a Geophysical Observer in oil exploration for Petty Geophysical.
