= Eguren =

Eguren is a surname. Notable people with the surname include:

- Sebastián Eguren (born 1981), Uruguayan footballer
- José Antonio Eguren, Peruvian Catholic archbishop
- José María Eguren, Peruvian writer
- Juan Carlos Eguren, Peruvian politician
- Juan José Eguiara y Eguren, Mexican Catholic scholar and bishop
