= Daniel Abugattás =

Peruvian politician (1955–2025)

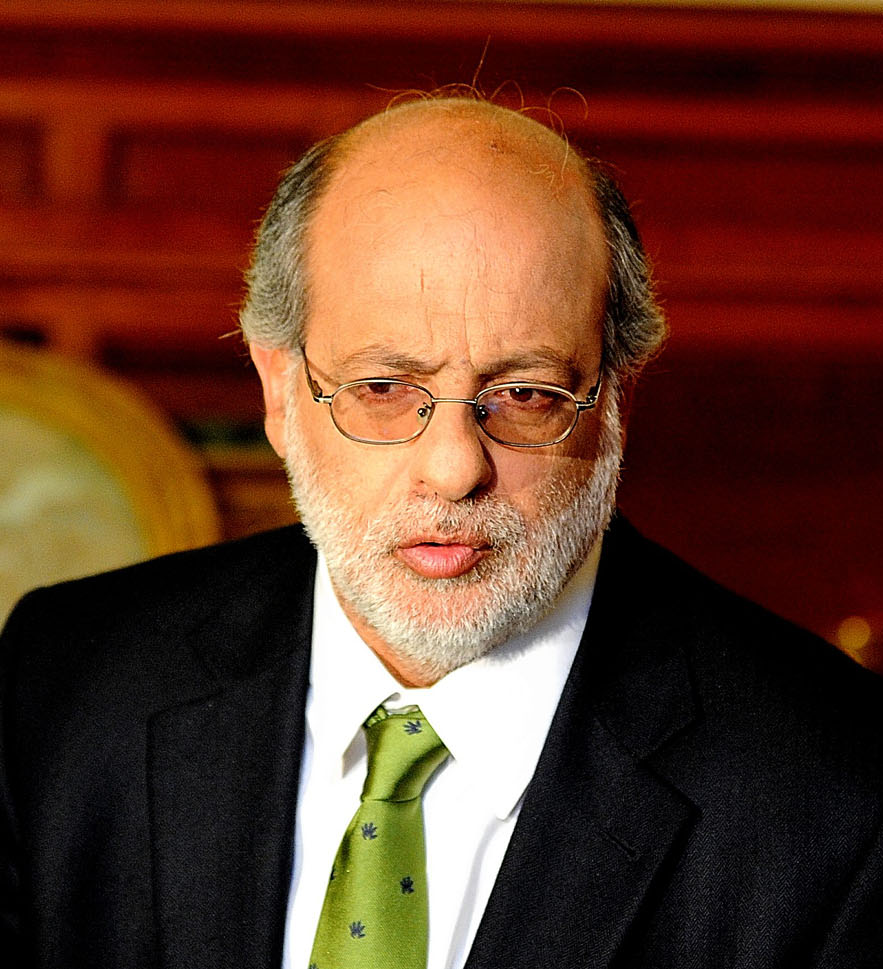
- Abugattás in 2012

President of Congress
- In office 26 July 2011 – 26 July 2012
- Vice President: 1st Vice President; Manuel Merino; 2nd Vice President; Yehude Simon; 3rd Vice President; Michael Urtecho
- Preceded by: César Zumaeta
- Succeeded by: Víctor Isla

Member of Congress
- In office 26 July 2006 – 26 July 2016
- Constituency: Lima

Personal details
- Born: Daniel Fernando Abugattás Majluf; 14 April 1955 Arequipa, Arequipa, Peru
- Died: 22 January 2025 (aged 69) Lima, Peru
- Party: Alliance for Progress
- Other political affiliations: Peruvian Nationalist Party (until 2016); Peru Wins (2010-2012)
- Education: PUCP
- Occupation: Politician
- Profession: Lawyer, businessman

Daniel Fernando Abugattás Majluf (14 April 1955 – 22 January 2025) was a Peruvian businessman and politician belonging to the Alliance for Progress. He was previously a Congressman representing the constituency of Lima from 2006 to 2016 and formerly belonged to the Peruvian Nationalist Party.

== Background ==
Daniel Abugattás was born on 14 April 1955 in Arequipa. He studied law at the Pontifical Catholic University of Peru in Lima. Subsequently, he pursued a master program in economic law at the Universidad Autónoma Metropolitana in Xochimilco, Mexico, from 1980 to 1981. Moreover, in 1982, he took a specialization course in quality management at the Japanese Association for Overseas Technical Scholarship (AOTS) in Osaka.

Abugattás died on 22 January 2025, at the age of 69.

== Career ==
From 1980 to 1994, he worked as a procurator for Fabrica Moderna S.A. in Lima. From 1994 to 2006, he was the general director of Nielsen Peru.

=== Political career ===
In the 2006 general election, he was elected as a congressman on the joint Union for Peru–Peruvian Nationalist Party list, representing Lima. After the breakup of the alliance following the 2006 elections, Abugattás decided to sit with the Nationalist bench. During the campaign, Abugattás was the spokesperson for Humala's candidacy for the presidency. However, after seriously insulting the nation's first lady, Eliane Karp, he was removed from office and replaced by Carlos Tapia.

From 2007 to 2011, he was a member of the political commission of the Nationalist Party. He began his parliamentary work as president of the Commission for Production, Micro and Small Enterprises. Ollanta Humala entrusted him with the task of organizing his party during non-electoral times, achieving in less than a year to affiliate 32,000 militants and opening nationalist bases in 70% of the national territory (until 2008).

He received the confidence of the plenary session of Parliament to preside over the "Petroaudios" Investigative Commission, where he played an important role in clarifying such acts of corruption. From 2010 to 2011, Abugattás was the spokesman of the Nationalist bench in Congress. After Ollanta Humala and his Nationalist-dominated Peru Wins alliance won the 2011 general election, in which Abugattás was re-elected to his seat, for the annual 2011–2012 term, he was elected President of the Congress. Abugattás received various criticisms for hirings that were made in Congress, including that of former congresswoman Nancy Obregón as a citizen participation advisor. In March 2016, he resigned from the Nationalist Party, as a result of the arbitrary and undemocratic decision of its leadership chaired by Nadine Heredia (wife of President Ollanta Humala), leaving him without a party and with an uncertain political future. He later joined the Alliance for Progress of César Acuña and attempted to run for a seat in Congress in the 2021 elections representing Lima but he was not elected.
