= Teniente Cesar Lopez Rojas District =

Coordinates: 6.0253°S 75.8786°W

Teniente César López Rojas
- District
- Interactive map of Teniente César López Rojas
- Country: Peru
- Region: Loreto
- Province: Alto Amazonas
- Founded: September 8, 1964
- Capital: Shucushuyacu

Government
  - Mayor: Narciso Reategui Rengifo

Area
  - Total: 1,495.91 km^{2} (577.57 sq mi)
- Elevation: 120 m (390 ft)

Population (2005 census)
  - Total: 6,107
  - Density: 4.082/km^{2} (10.57/sq mi)
- Time zone: UTC-5 (PET)
- UBIGEO: 160211

Teniente César López Rojas District (Spanish teniente lieutenant) is one of six districts of the province Alto Amazonas in Peru. The district was established on 8 September 1964.
