= Pablo Maroni =

Pablo Maroni (Paul; born 1 November 1695) was a Jesuit missionary to the Viceroyalty of Peru.

== Life ==
He entered the Austrian province of the Jesuits on 27 October 1712, and, like many German and Austrian missionaries of that time, went in 1723 on the mission in Upper Marañón that belonged to the Audience of Quito, province of the order. He worked for several years as professor of theology at Quito and then with great success as Indian missionary on the rivers Napo and Aguarico. He converted a number of tribes to the Christian faith and founding a series of new reducciones (i.e. settlements of converted Indians).

At the same time he carefully explored those regions, as acknowledged by the French geographer Jean-Baptiste Bourguignon d'Anville, in his Letter to the Editors “on a map of Southern America he had just published” (“Lettre de Monsieur d’Anville à Messieurs du Journal des sçavans sur une Carte de l’Amérique Méridionale qu’il vient de publier”), in Journal des sçavans, March 1750, p. 183, where D’Anville said he had received Maroni’s map from Charles Marie de La Condamine.

== Works ==
Maroni left behind him a number of works. Two of them are:

- "Diario de la entrada que hizo el P. Pablo Maroni de Ia C. d. J. por el rio coriño ó Pastaza ... el año 1737", published by P. Sanvicente, S. J. in El Industrial (Quito, 1895), año IV., num 132, 133, 135;
- Noticias autenticas del famoso rio Marañon y misión apóstolica de la Compañia de Jesús de la provincia de Quito en los dilatados bosques de dicho rio escribilas por los anos de 1738 un misinero de la misma compania y las publicas ahora por primera vez Marcos Jimenez de la Espada (Madrid, 1889), with maps drawn up by Maroni. It contains, among other documents, the personal diaries of the cartographer and missionary Samuel Fritz, compiled after Fritz's death and interspersed with commentary.
