= Adana Omágua Kambeba =

Brazilian doctor and shaman

Adana Omágua Kambeba (baptised as Danielle Soprano Pereira) is a Brazilian doctor and shaman. A member of the Omagua people, her work focuses on bridging gaps between Western medicine and indigenous folk medicine.

== Early life and education ==
Omágua Kambeba was born and raised in the outskirts of Manaus, Amazonas, a city in the Brazilian Amazon. She is a member of the Omagua people. In 2012, Omágua Kambeba began studying medicine at the Federal University of Minas Gerais in Belo Horizonte. During her studies, she also began the process to become a pajé, including training on the traditional use of ayahuasca.

Omágua Kambeba's studies were interrupted by the COVID-19 pandemic, during which she volunteered as an emergency worker in both Belo Horizonte and Manaus. She received her medical diploma in 2022; she became the first indigenous Amazonian woman to graduate in medicine from the Federal University of Minas Gerais.

Omágua Kambeba is a member of União de Vegetal since 2013.

== Medical career ==
Omágua Kambeba registered with the Federal Council of Medicine in 2022, allowing her to practice as a doctor in Brazil; she became the first doctor to have both her indigenous name and baptised name recognised by the council. Between 2022 and 2025, she worked at a maternity unit and a dengue emergency centre at Sofia Feldman Hospital in Belo Horizonte. Omágua Kambeba specialised in field and community medicine, women's health and childbirth. Omágua Kambeba established a Federal Council of Medicine commission for the integration of traditional indigenous medicine and scientific medicine. She was the first indigenous doctor to sit on a panel.

Throughout her career, and exclusively since 2025, Omágua Kambeba has advocated for the use of indigenous folk medicine alongside Western medical practices. She has stated her intent to "mediate" between disputes that occur in the medical treatment of indigenous people, noting that Western-trained doctors can mistrust indigenous practices, and indigenous people in turn can mistrust Western medicine. In April 2025, Omágua Kambeba started a project with the aim to sail down the Amazon River to visit 35 Omagua communities to address health inequalities in addition to providing training on suicide prevention and child sexual abuse.

Omágua Kambeba has denounced what she has described as "colonialism" in medical research, including the "stealing" of indigenous knowledge, such as around the use of ayahuasca, without acknowledging the significant indigenous history and knowledge of the substance and its use.
