= Balsa Puerto District =

Coordinates: 5.8291°S 76.5689°W

- District
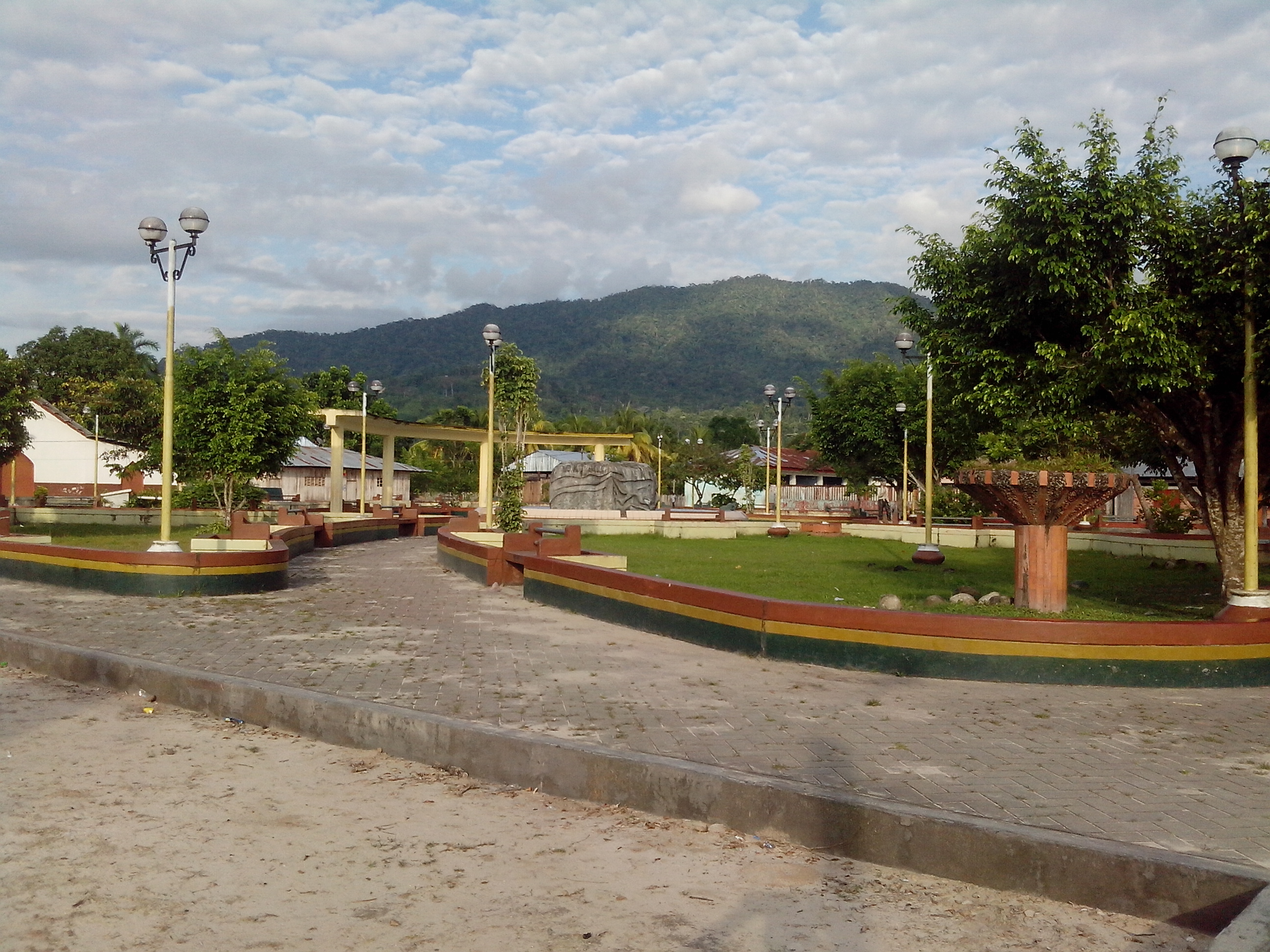
- Interactive map of Balsa Puerto District
- Country: Peru
- Region: Loreto
- Province: Alto Amazonas
- Founded: January 2, 1857
- Capital: Balsa Puerto

Government
  - Mayor: Orlando Vasquez Mori

Area
  - Total: 2,839.69 km^{2} (1,096.41 sq mi)
- Elevation: 220 m (720 ft)

Population (2005 census)
  - Total: 12,730
  - Density: 4.483/km^{2} (11.61/sq mi)
- Time zone: UTC-5 (PET)
- UBIGEO: 160202

Balsa Puerto District is one of six districts of the province Alto Amazonas in Peru.
