= Juan Carlos Eguren =

Peruvian politician

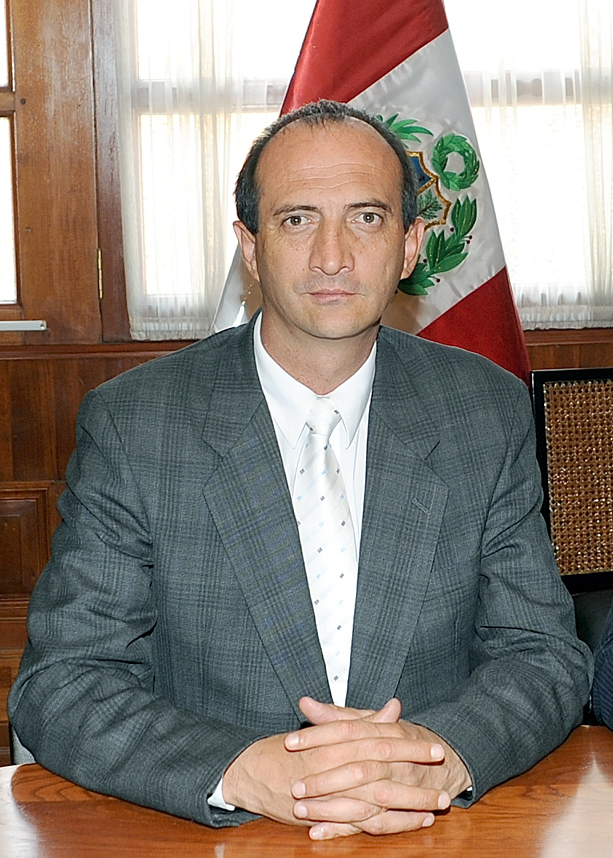
- Juan Carlos Eguren in 2010

Second Vice President of Congress
- In office 26 July 2012 – 26 July 2013
- President: Víctor Isla
- Preceded by: Yehude Simon
- Succeeded by: Luis Iberico Núñez

Member of Congress
- In office 26 July 2006 – 26 July 2016
- Constituency: Arequipa

Personal details
- Born: Juan Carlos Eguren Neuenschwander; 1 April 1965 (age 60) Arequipa, Peru
- Party: Christian People's Party
- Other political affiliations: National Unity
- Occupation: Politician

Juan Carlos Eguren Neuenschwander (born 1 April 1965, in Arequipa) is a Peruvian politician (PPC) and a former Congressman representing the Arequipa region for two terms between 2006 and 2016.

== Career ==
Eguren holds a bachelor's degree in law. Before he entered Congress, he worked as commercial manager for Tecnología e Importación S.A., a major bottling company. In his Christian People's Party, he acted as doctrine secretary on the level of Arquipa region from 1989 to 2002.

He founded the University Movement Force and Action for Student Change in 1985. He trained politically and doctrinally at the José Faustino Sánchez Carrión Institute, sponsored by the Konrad Adenauer Foundation and chaired by Ernesto Alayza Grundy.

== Political career ==
In 1989, he was elected to the provincial council of Arequipa Province for a four-year term. In the 2006 election, was elected to Congress for the 2006–2011 term, representing the Arequipa region under the National Unity list. In the 2011 election, he was reelected on the ticket of the Alliance for the Great Change, for the 2011-2016 term to which the Christian Democrats now belong. He ran for the presidency of the Christian People’s Party in October 2011, but was defeated by Raúl Castro Stagnaro. In June 2015, he voted against the bill on Abortion in Cases of Rape, holding that pregnancies occur in greater numbers in the family environment, that sexual assault rarely generates pregnancies and that even "a large part of rapists are not even able to ejaculate "because they even" suffer from erectile dysfunction. "3 He argued that therefore the issue should be approached from other perspectives. He is a known conservative. He lost his seat in the 2016 elections, when he ran for re-election under the Popular Alliance which grouped the PPC's old rival, the APRA party, but he was not re-elected.
