= Santa Cruz District, Alto Amazonas =

Coordinates: 5.5493°S 76.3605°W

Santa Cruz District
- District
- Interactive map of Santa Cruz District
- Country: Peru
- Region: Loreto
- Province: Alto Amazonas
- Founded: February 7, 1866
- Capital: Santa Cruz

Government
  - Mayor: Persi Ruiz Cainamari

Area
  - Total: 1,093.61 km^{2} (422.25 sq mi)
- Elevation: 149 m (489 ft)

Population (2005 census)
  - Total: 4,447
  - Density: 4.066/km^{2} (10.53/sq mi)
- Time zone: UTC-5 (PET)
- UBIGEO: 160210

Santa Cruz District is one of six districts of the province Alto Amazonas in Peru.
