= Association for Overseas Technical Scholarship =

The Association for Overseas Technical Scholarship (AOTS; Japanese: 海外技術者研修協会) was established in 1959 with the support of the Ministry of International Trade and Industry (now the Ministry of Economy, Trade, and Industry, METI) as the first technical cooperation organization on a private basis in Japan. Its main purpose is to promote international economic cooperation and enhance mutual economic development and friendly relations between those countries and Japan. The main activities of AOTS are as follows:

- Training of engineers and managers from developing countries in Japan
- Training of engineers and managers in overseas countries
- Management of Kenshu Centers

AOTS has been merged with Japan Overseas Development Corporation (JODC)and is now the Overseas Human Resources and Industry Development Association (HIDA). The merger was done on March 30, 2012. The Overseas Human Resources and Industry Development Association (HIDA) was incorporated on 1 April 2013.

AOTS has established many alumni societies in each participant countries. The many societies still carry the name of AOTS.
