= Yurimaguas District =

Coordinates: 5.8952°S 76.1343°W

- District
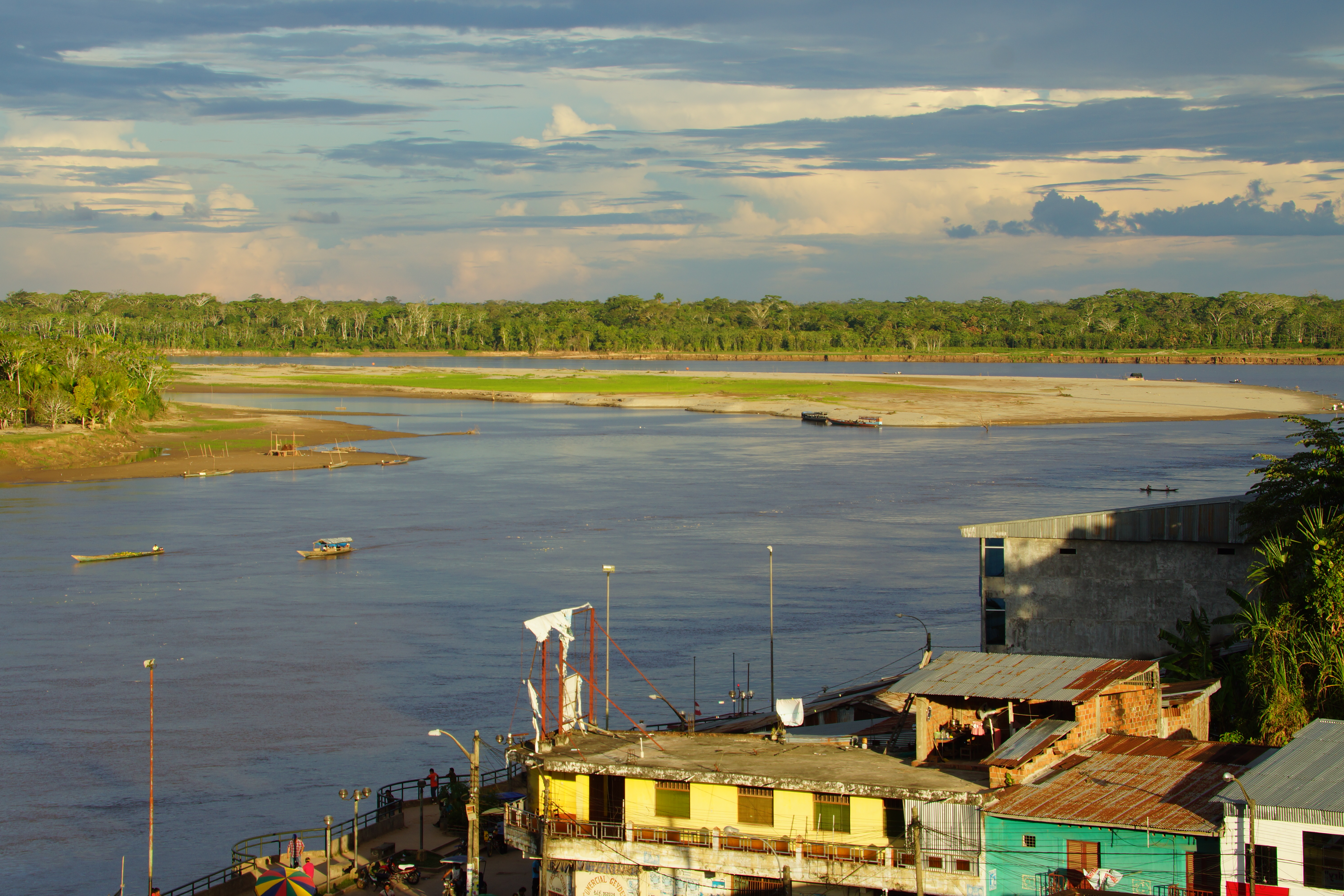
- Huallaga River near Yurimaguas
- Interactive map of Yurimaguas District
- Country: Peru
- Region: Loreto
- Province: Alto Amazonas
- Founded: February 7, 1866
- Capital: Yurimaguas

Government
  - Mayor: Hugo Araujo Del Águila (2019-2022)

Area
  - Total: 2,674.71 km^{2} (1,032.71 sq mi)
- Elevation: 182 m (597 ft)

Population (2017)
  - Total: 83,554
  - Density: 31.239/km^{2} (80.907/sq mi)
- Time zone: UTC-5 (PET)
- UBIGEO: 160201

Yurimaguas District is one of the six districts of the province of Alto Amazonas in Peru.
