= Yarapa River =

River in the Amazon rainforest, Peru

The Yarapa River is located in the Peruvian Amazon rainforest. The area is the subject of scientific research, as well as being a tourist destination.

The river is home to many crocodiles.
