= Cocama language =

Tupi language spoken in South America

Cocama
- Kokáma
- Native to: Peru, Brazil, Colombia, Venezuela
- Ethnicity: 16,000 Cambeba et al. (2007), Kokama
- Native speakers: 250 in Peru (2007) few in other countries
- Language family: Tupian: Tupi–Guarani; Tupi; Cocama–Omagua (Note: Cabral (2012) argues that Kokama/Omagua is a mixed language, and so not directly classifiable, though most of its basic vocabulary is Tupi–Guarani.); Cocama
- Dialects: Cocama; Cocamilla

Language codes
- ISO 639-3: cod
- Glottolog: coca1259
- ELP: Cocama-Cocamilla
- Linguasphere: 88-AAH-a
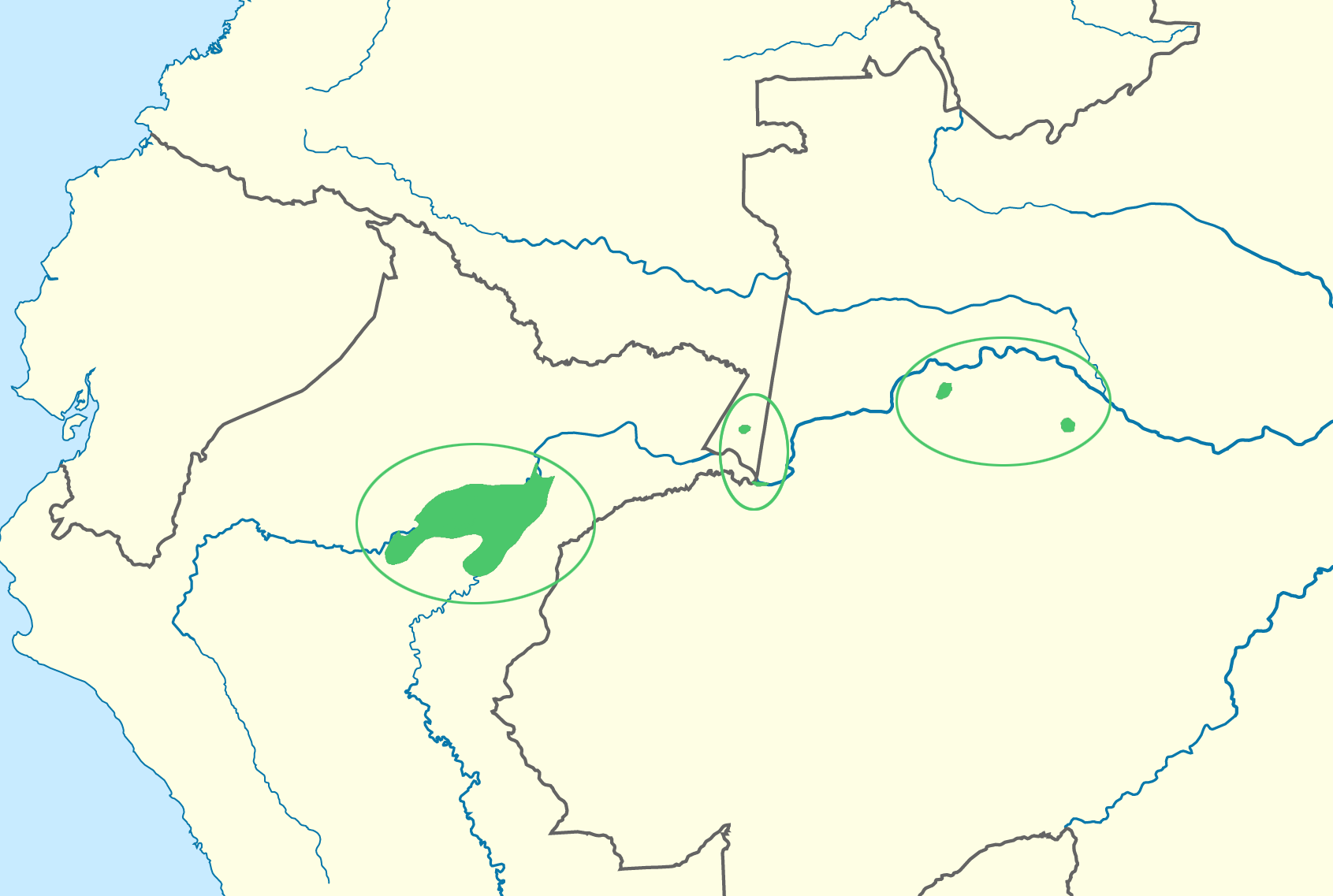

Cocama (Kokáma) is a language spoken by thousands of people in western South America. It is spoken along the banks of the Northeastern lower Ucayali, lower Marañón, and Huallaga rivers and in neighboring areas of Brazil and an isolated area in Colombia. There are three dialects. The robust dialect is known as Cocama, Kokama, Kukama-Kukamiria, Ucayali, Xibitaoan, Huallaga, Pampadeque, and Pandequebo. By 1999, Cocamilla (Kokamíya) was moribund, being only spoken by people over 40.

== Classification ==
Cocama is closely related to Omagua, a nearly extinct language spoken in Peru and Brazil.

== Geographic distribution ==
Out of a projected ethnic population of 15,000, the majority of Cocama speakers, 2,000, live in Peru. Remaining speakers live in Amazonas state in Brazil, where 50 out of 411 ethnic Chayahuitas speak it and it is known as Kokama or Kokamilla. Most speakers are trilingual and can also speak Portuguese and Spanish. Very few are monolingual. There are 20 ethnic groups in Colombia's Lower Putumayo area with an unknown number of Cocama-Cocamilla speakers. Most expected speakers would also be trilingual, but the language may be extinct in the region.

== Revitalization efforts ==
In 2013, residents of Nauta, Loreto Province, Peru created a children's rap video in the Kukama-Kukamiria dialect, in collaboration with Radio Ucamara. The local radio station has been involved in efforts to preserve the language for "a few years," and "started managing a school called Ikuar, with the goal of teaching the language through songs and traditional story telling."

== Phonology ==
=== Consonants ===
	Labial	Alveolar	Palatal	Velar
Plosive	p	t		k
Fricative				x
Affricate		t͡s	t͡ʃ	
Nasal	m	n		
Tap/Flap		ɾ		
Semivowel	w		j	

Plosive sounds may also be realized as voiced.

=== Vowels ===
	Front	Central	Back
Close	i	ɨ	u
Mid	e		
Open		a	

=== Phonetic realisations ===
Phoneme	Allophones
/p/	[p], [b]
/t/	[t], [d]
/k/	[k], [ɡ], [kʰ]
/ts/	[ts], [s], [tʃ]
/tʃ/	[tʃ], [ʃ]
/n/	[n], [ɲ], [ŋ]
/ɾ/	[ɾ], [l]
/w/	[w], [β]
/j/	[j], [z]
/i/	[i], [ɪ], [e]
/e/	[e], [ə], [ɪ]
/ɨ/	[ɨ], [ɪ]
/u/	[u], [ʊ], [o]

== Orthography ==
Cocama alphabet (Peru)
a	ë	i	ɨ	u	p	t	k	m	n
j	r	ts	ch	sh	w	ÿ	y		

Cocama speakers have a 3% literacy rate, compared with 50% for Spanish. Grammar rules have been developed and the language is written using the Latin script. Parts of the Bible have been translated into the language.
