= Omagua language =

Endangered Tupian language of South America

Omagua
- Cambeba
- umawa kumɪsa
- Native to: Peru; formerly in Brazil
- Ethnicity: Omagua
- Native speakers: 2 (2020)
- Language family: Tupian: Tupi–Guarani; Tupi; Cocama–Omagua; Omagua

Language codes
- ISO 639-3: omg
- Glottolog: omag1248
- ELP: Omagua
- Linguasphere: 88-AAH-b

Omagua (Agua, Anapia, Ariana, Cambeba, Cambeeba, Cambela, Campeba, Canga-Peba, Compeva, Janbeba, Kambeba, Macanipa, Omagua-Yete, Pariana, Umaua, Yhuata, Omagua: umawa kumɪsa) is a Tupi-Guarani language closely related to Cocama, belonging to the Group III subgroup of the Tupí-Guaraní family, according to Aryon Rodrigues' classification of the family.

== Geographic distribution ==
When Europeans first arrived in the western Amazon Basin in significant number in the late 17th and early 18th century, Omagua was spoken by approximately 100,000 individuals in two major areas: along the Amazon River proper, between the mouths of the Napo River and Jutaí River, and in the vicinity of the Aguarico River, a tributary of the upper Napo River. At this time, then, Omagua speakers lived in regions corresponding to modern eastern Peruvian Amazonia, western Brazilian Amazonia, and eastern Ecuadoran Amazonia.

These Omagua populations were decimated by disease, Portuguese slave raids, and conflicts with Spanish colonial authorities during the early 18th century, leaving them drastically reduced. As of 2011, Omagua was spoken by "fewer than ten elderly individuals" in Peru, and by a number of semi-speakers near the towns of Coari and Tefé in Brazil, where the language is known as Cambeba (Grenand and Grenand 1997).

== Genesis ==
Comparative work by Cabral (1996) demonstrated that Omagua (and its sister language Cocama) exhibit significant grammatical restructuring effects due to intense language contact between a Tupí-Guaraní language and speakers of one or more non-Tupí-Guaraní languages. Rodrigues and Cabral (2003) further suggest that Cocama (and by extension, Omagua) could be considered the outcomes of rapid creolization. Cabral (1996) argued that this language contact transpired in the late 17th century in Jesuit mission settlements, while Michael (2014) argues that the language contact situation responsible for the genesis of Omagua and Cocama transpired during the Pre-Columbian period.

== Phonology ==
=== Consonants ===
Consonants of Omagua
	Bilabial	Alveolar	Palatal	Velar	Labial- velar	Uvular
Plosive	p	t		k	kʷ	
Nasal	m	n				ɴ
Affricate		(ts)	(t̠ʃ)			
Fricative		s	ʃ			
Approximant			j		w	
Tap		ɾ				

Omagua has thirteen consonants across five places of articulation. /ts/ and /tʃ/ only occur in a small number of words: /tʃ/ may have entered the inventory through loanwords from Cocama or Quechua.

=== Vowels ===
Vowels of Omagua
	Front	Central	Back
Close	i	ɨ	u
Near-close	ɪ		
Open	a		

Omagua has five vowels: /i, ɪ, ɨ, u, a/. This is somewhat unusual, as there are four high vowels but only one low vowel (/a/).

== See also ==
- Cocama language
