= Alto Amazonas province =

Coordinates: 5°54′S 76°05′W

Alto Amazonas
- Province
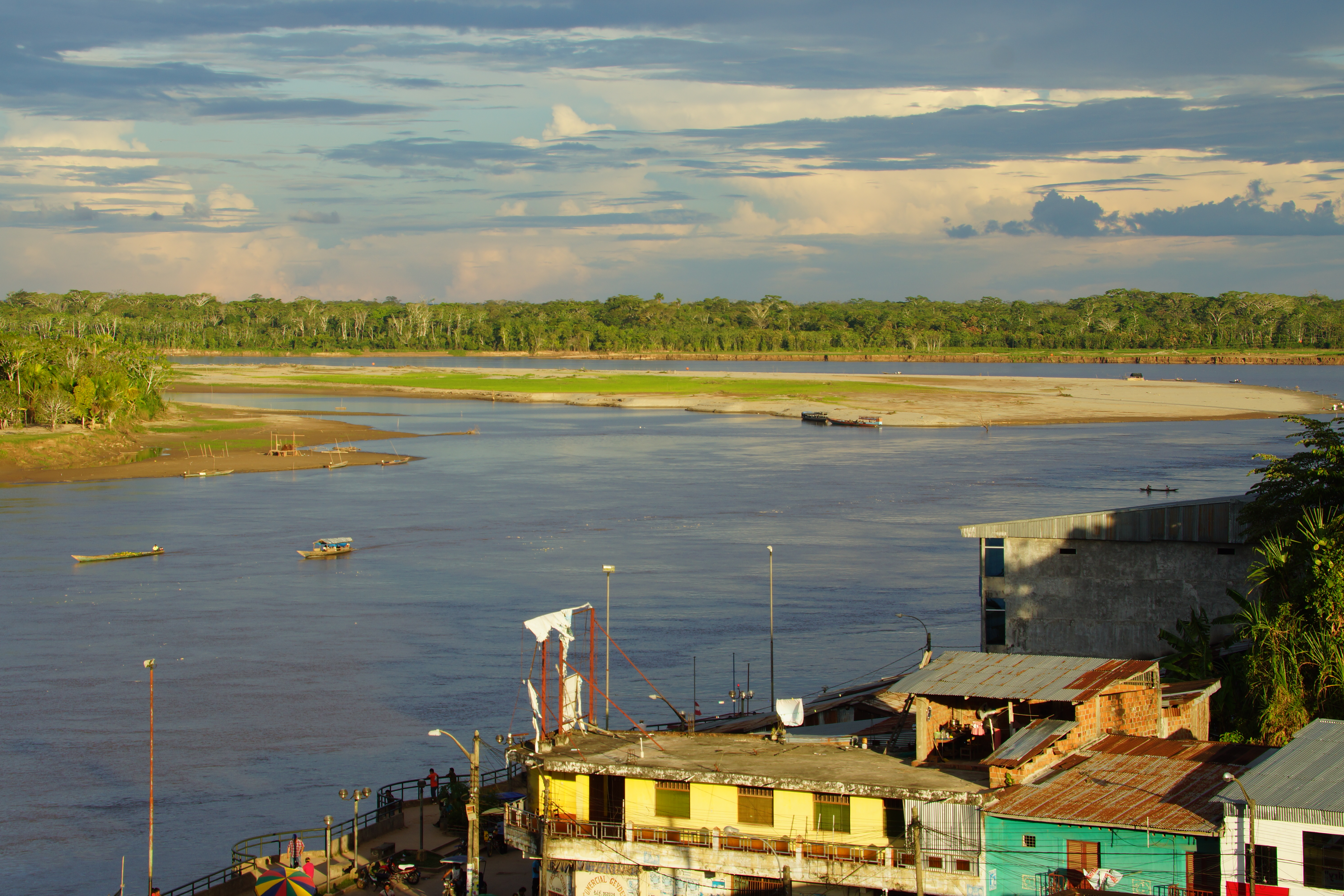
- Huallaga River near Yurimaguas

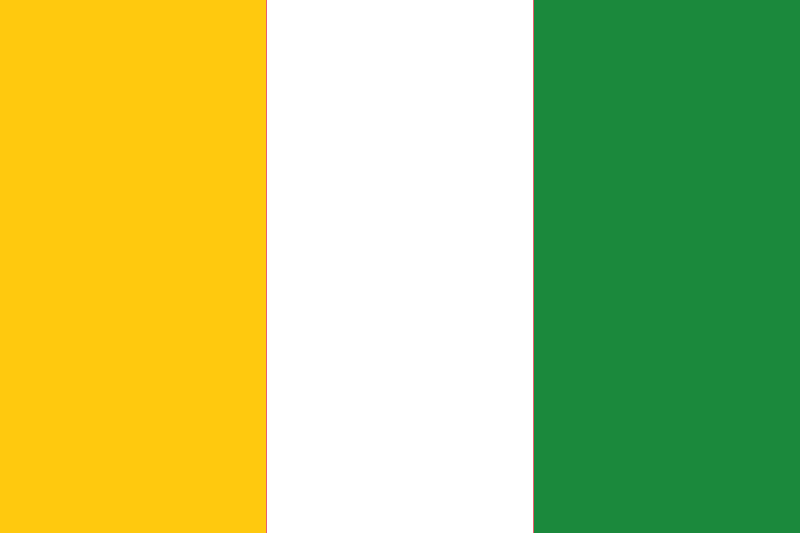
- Flag Coat of arms
- Interactive map of Alto Amazonas
- Country: Peru
- Region: Loreto
- Capital: Yurimaguas

Government
  - Mayor: Hector Hidalgo Rojas

Area
  - Total: 18,764.32 km^{2} (7,244.94 sq mi)
- Elevation: 182 m (597 ft)

Population
  - Total: 101,934
  - Density: 5.43233/km^{2} (14.0697/sq mi)
- UBIGEO: 1602
- Website: www.muniaa.gob.pe

Alto Amazonas is one of the eight provinces in the Loreto Region of Peru. Located in the northeastern Peruvian Amazon, the culturally and biodiverse province of Alto Amazonas is divided into six districts. On August 1, 2005 (law Nº 8593), the districts of Barranca, Cahuapanas, Manseriche, Morona and Pastaza were reallocated to the newly created province of Datem del Marañón.

== Political division ==
The province measures 18,764.32 square kilometres (7,244.94 sq mi)] and is divided into six districts:

District	Mayor	Capital	Ubigeo
Balsa Puerto	Alfredo Torres	Balsa Puerto	060202
Jeberos	Amadeo Maca Rios	Jeberos	060205
Lagunas	Alberto Rengifo Chanchari	Lagunas	060206
Santa Cruz	Persi Ruiz Cainamari	Santa Cruz	060210
Teniente Cesar Lopez Rojas	Narciso Reategui Rengifo	Shucushuyacu	060211
Yurimaguas	Hector Hidalgo Rojas	Yurimaguas	060201
