= Yurimaguas =

- Town
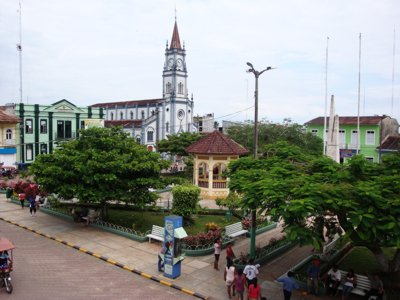
- Plaza de Armas of Yurimaguas

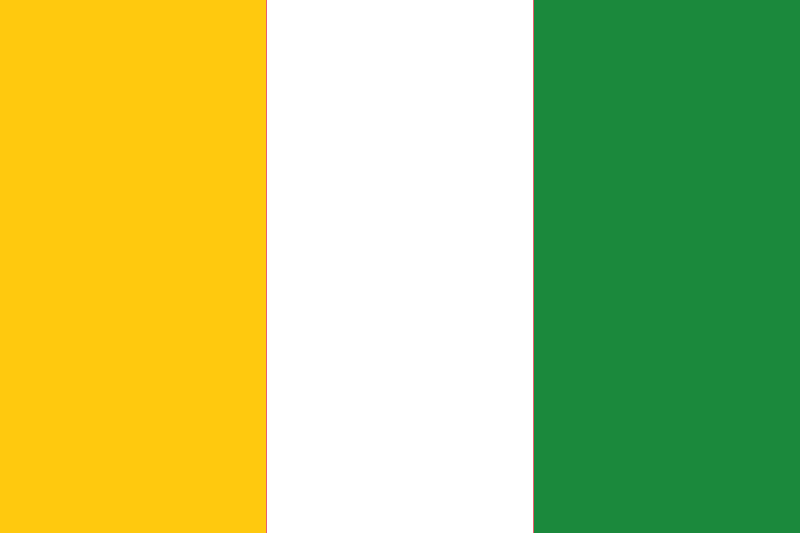
- Flag
- Nickname: Perla del Huallaga (Pearl of the Huallaga)
- Location within Peru
- Coordinates: 5°54′S 76°05′W
- Country: Peru
- Region: Loreto
- Province: Alto Amazonas
- District: Yurimaguas

Government
  - Mayor: Hugo Araujo Del Águila (2019-2022)

Area
  - Total: 2,674.71 km^{2} (1,032.71 sq mi)
- Elevation: 106 m (348 ft)

Population
  - Estimate (2017): 62,903
- Time zone: UTC-5 (PET)
  - Summer (DST): UTC-5 (PET)
- Climate: Tropical
- Website: miselvaquerida.net

Yurimaguas is a port town in the Loreto Region of the northeastern Peruvian Amazon. Historically associated with the Mainas missions, the culturally diverse town is affectionately known as the "Pearl of the Huallaga" (Perla del Huallaga). Yurimaguas is located at the confluence of the majestic Huallaga and Paranapura Rivers in the steamy rainforests of northeastern Peru. It is the capital of both Alto Amazonas Province and Yurimaguas District, and had a population estimated at 62,903 inhabitants (2017).

With a long history, Yurimaguas is a tourist destination, especially during the August 15 annual Catholic festival of the Assumption. Long dominated by the presence of the Church, the town is home to the Apostolic Vicariate of Yurimaguas, Loreto Region. Visited in 1855 by the botanist Richard Spruce, Yurimaguas remains an important commercial center for subsistence and market oriented farmers or ribereños (who cultivate sugar cane, bananas, cotton, tobacco, manioc and other comestible produce) and fishermen.

Yurimaguas is notable for being the last urban center in Loreto connected by highway with the rest of Peru: a recently paved road links Yurimaguas with Tarapoto and Moyobamba, located in the tropical Andes (high-jungle), or as it is known in the vernacular, the montaña. While the Moisés Benzaquén Rengifo Airport was first established in Yurimaguas in 1937, it is now barely functioning (the collapse of the Peruvian airline Aero Continente left only two airlines serving the airport). For the majority of the populace, transit is dominated by river travel. In the ports of Yurimaguas trade is in tropical forest produce, particularly hardwoods, petroleum, contraband, and goods (licit and otherwise) from the Andean highlands or Pacific Coast sent down-river to Iquitos and beyond (the Port Authority of Yurimaguas, ENAPU is in charge of the International Puerto de Yurimaguas, Peru). Yurimaguas boasts a magnificent Cathedral built by the Passionist Order, and modeled after the Cathedral in Burgos, Spain.

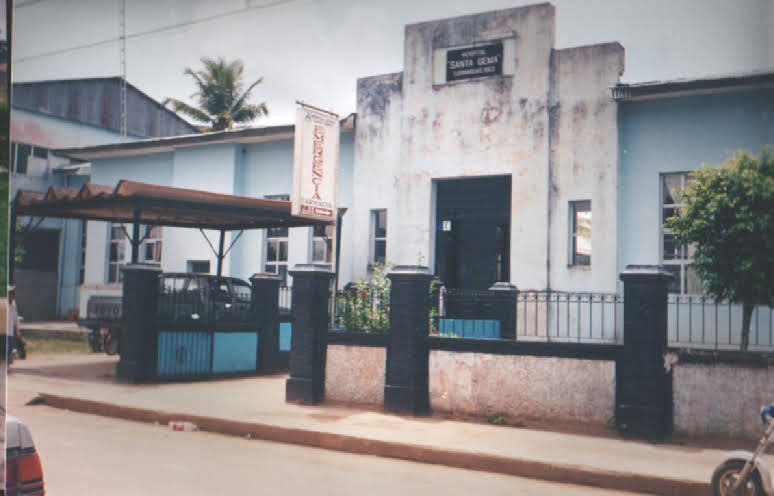
Santa Gema Hospital
