= Jeberos District =

Coordinates: 5.2827°S 76.8438°W

- District
- Interactive map of Jeberos District
- Country: Peru
- Region: Loreto
- Province: Alto Amazonas
- Founded: January 2, 1857
- Capital: Jeberos

Government
  - Mayor: Amadeo Maca Rios

Area
  - Total: 4,574.11 km^{2} (1,766.07 sq mi)
- Elevation: 165 m (541 ft)

Population (2005 census)
  - Total: 3,855
  - Density: 0.8428/km^{2} (2.183/sq mi)
- Time zone: UTC-5 (PET)
- UBIGEO: 160205

Jeberos District is one of six districts of the province Alto Amazonas in Peru.
