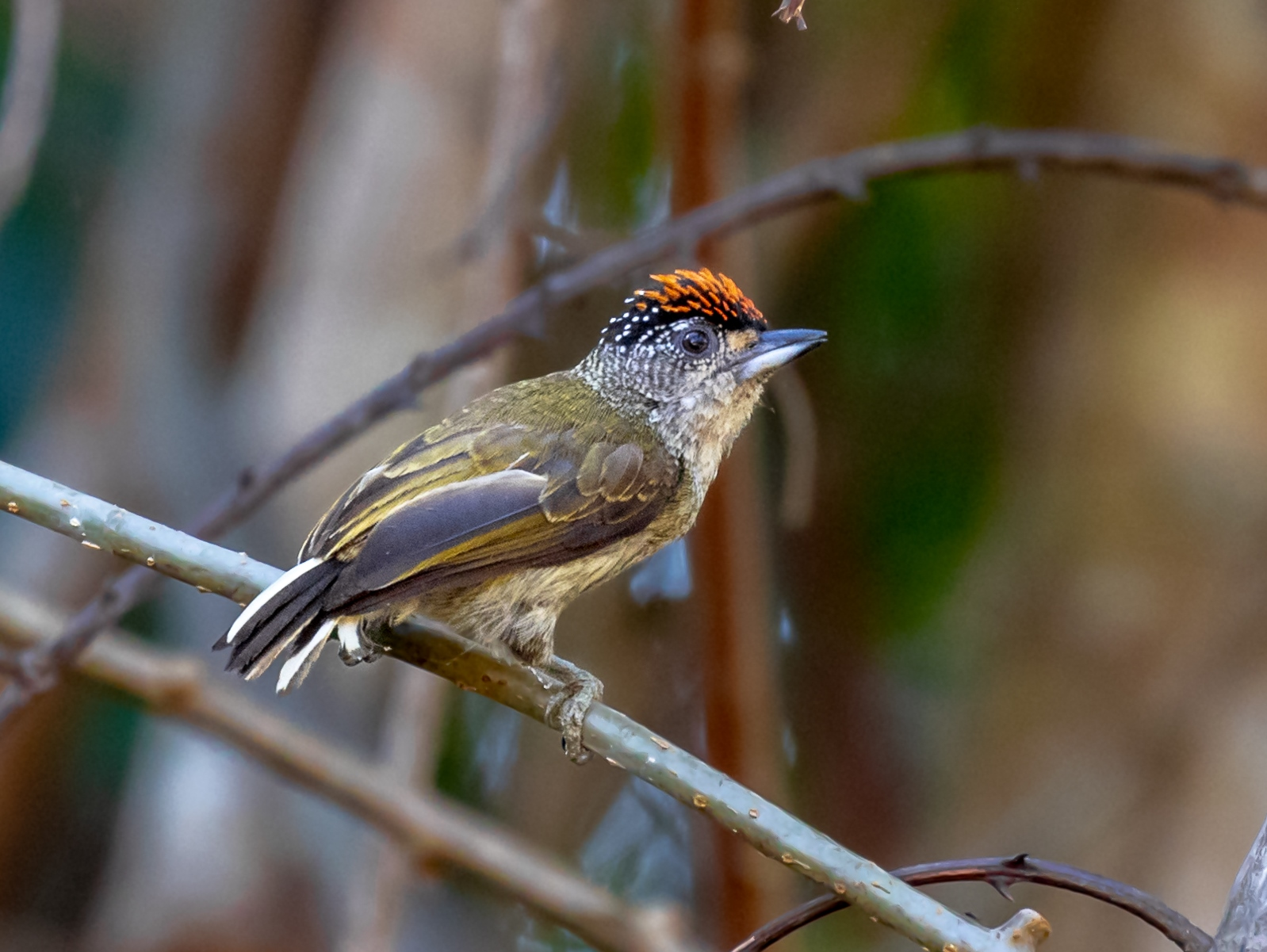
- male

Conservation status
- Least Concern (IUCN 3.1)

Scientific classification
- Kingdom: Animalia
- Phylum: Chordata
- Class: Aves
- Order: Piciformes
- Family: Picidae
- Genus: Picumnus
- Species: P. subtilis

Binomial name
- Picumnus subtilis Stager, 1968

= Fine-barred piculet =

Species of woodpecker

The fine-barred piculet (Picumnus subtilis) is a species of bird in subfamily Picumninae of the woodpecker family Picidae. It is found in Brazil and Peru.

== Taxonomy and systematics ==
The fine-barred piculet is monotypic. Some authors consider it and the plain-breasted piculet (P. castelnau) to be sister species and they might hybridize.

== Description ==
The fine-barred piculet is about 10 cm (3.9 in) long and weighs about 10 to 11 g (0.35 to 0.39 oz). Adult males have a black crown and nape with wide reddish orange tips on the feathers of the forecrown and white spots on the rest. Their face is mostly light brown with some gray and whitish vermiculation. Their upperparts are yellowish olive with olive inclusions that give a faintly barred appearance. Their flight feathers are dusky brown with olive yellow edges on the secondaries. Their tail is black; the innermost pair of feathers have white inner webs. Their chin and throat are dull white. Their underparts are gray with straw yellow tips and bars. Their iris is brown, the beak black with a blue-gray base to the mandible, and the legs olive with a green tinge. Adult females are identical but with white spots on the whole crown and no red. Juveniles have a brownish black to sooty black crown with wide off-white to buff streaks, and their upperparts are more heavily barred than adults'.

== Distribution and habitat ==
The fine-barred piculet was long thought to be endemic to southeastern Peru but since about 2009 is also known from Acre state in far western Brazil though there appears to be a gap between the areas. In Peru it is best known along the upper Ucayali River; the Brazilian records are along the Purus River. Both are tributaries of the Amazon. In Peru it mostly occurs in primary forest along rivers but also in nearby secondary forest. In Brazil it occurs at the edges of terra firme forest in areas heavy with Guadua bamboo. In elevation it reaches as high as 1,100 m (3,600 ft).

== Behavior ==
=== Feeding ===
The fine-barred piculet forages on slender branches, stems, and vines, usually from the forest mid-storey to the canopy. It is typically seen singly or in pairs as part of mixed species foraging flocks. Its diet has not been detailed but is assumed to be insects.

=== Breeding ===
The fine-barred piculet's breeding season appears to include June and July and might extend to December. Nothing else is known about its breeding biology.

=== Vocal and non-vocal sounds ===
The fine-barred piculet's song is "a descending series of sharp, high notes (generally about 7): SEE see see see see see see." It makes soft tapping sounds while foraging.

== Status ==
The IUCN has assessed the fine-barred piculet as being of Least Concern, though its population size is unknown and believed to be decreasing. No immediate threats have been identified. It is thought to be "fairly common", and "[h]uman activity has little short-term direct effect on Fine-barred Piculet, other than the local effects of habitat destruction."
