= Pachitea =

Pachitea can refer to:

- Pachitea Province, a province in the Huánuco Region in Peru
- Pachitea River, a river in Peru
- Pachitea (leafhopper), a genus of insects in the tribe Cicadellini
