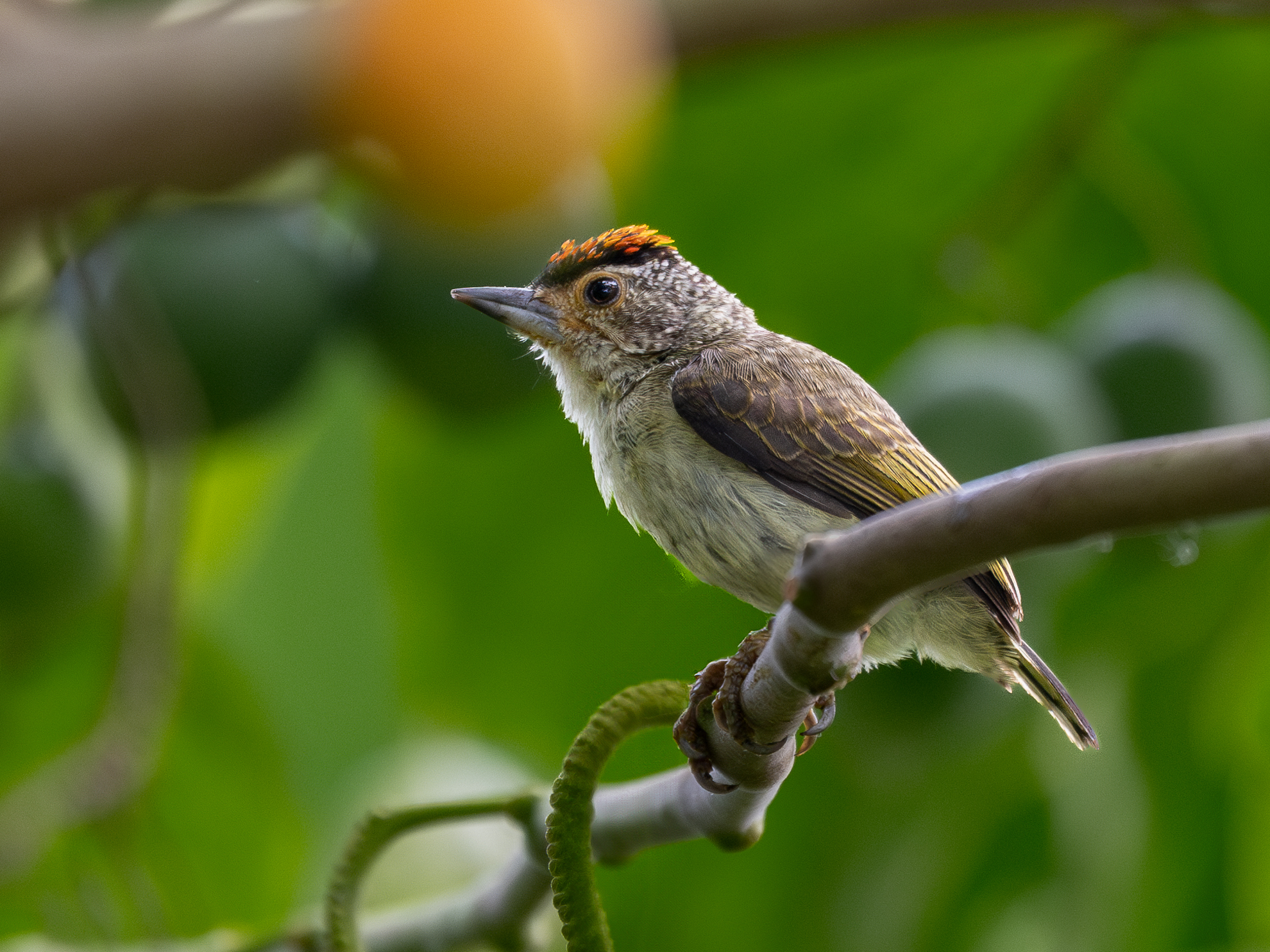

Conservation status
- Least Concern (IUCN 3.1)

Scientific classification
- Kingdom: Animalia
- Phylum: Chordata
- Class: Aves
- Order: Piciformes
- Family: Picidae
- Genus: Picumnus
- Species: P. castelnau

Binomial name
- Picumnus castelnau Malherbe, 1862

= Plain-breasted piculet =

Species of woodpecker

The plain-breasted piculet (Picumnus castelnau) is a species of bird in subfamily Picumninae of the woodpecker family Picidae. It is found in the Brazil, Colombia, and Peru.

== Taxonomy and systematics ==
The plain-breasted piculet is monotypic. Its position within genus Picumnus is not positively known, but some authors consider it and the fine-barred piculet (P. subtilis) to be sister species and they might hybridize.

== Description ==
The plain-breasted piculet is 8 to 10 cm (3.1 to 3.9 in) long and weighs about 11 to 12 g (0.39 to 0.42 oz). Adult males have a black crown with red tips on the feathers. The sides of their crown and their nape are whitish with faint black speckles or bars. Their face is mostly light brown with some gray and whitish vermiculation. Their upperparts are grayish olive. Their flight feathers are brown with greenish yellow edges on the secondaries. Their tail is black; the innermost pair and outer three pairs of feathers have white inner webs. Their underparts are unmarked dull yellowish white. Their iris is brown, the beak black with a blue-gray base to the mandible, and the legs greenish yellow to bluish gray. Adult females are identical but with an entirely black crown. Juveniles are duller than adults and have faint barring on the upper- and underparts.

== Distribution and habitat ==
The plain-breasted piculet is found along the Ucayali and upper Amazon rivers. Most of its range is in Peru but it extends very slightly through extreme southeastern Colombia into extreme western Brazil. It mostly inhabits forest on river islands and the river banks, but also occurs in nearby secondary forest and occasionally in vegetation on the edges of pastures and gardens. It is most common in the canopy of young Cecropia, Cassia, and Mimosa trees on islands. In elevation it occurs as high as 1,000 m (3,300 ft).

== Behavior ==
=== Feeding ===
The plain-breasted piculet forages for its diet of small insects on slender branches and stems, usually about 6 to 15 m (20 to 49 ft) above the ground but sometimes lower along forest edges. It hops along and among the branches, picking, tapping, and probing for its prey. It is typically seen singly, in pairs, or in groups of up to four individuals that are thought to be families. It also sometimes joins mixed species foraging flocks.

=== Breeding ===
The plain-breasted piculet's breeding season appears to include at least from May to July. It is assumed to nest in small cavities like other piculets, but essentially nothing is known about its breeding biology.

=== Vocal and non-vocal sounds ===
The plain-breasted piculet's song is "a high-pitched, rapid, falling trill: tree'e'e'e'e'e'e." It makes soft tapping sounds while foraging.

== Status ==
The IUCN has assessed the plain-breasted piculet as being of Least Concern, though its population size is unknown and believed to be decreasing. No immediate threats have been identified. It is thought to be "fairly common", and "can occupy woody second growth...and so may be able to tolerate moderate levels of habitat disturbance."
