= Pacaya River =

- Native name: Río Pacaya (Spanish)

Location
- Country: Peru

Physical characteristics
- Source
  - coordinates: 6.3856°S 75.2211°W
- Mouth: Ucayali River
  - location: Bretaña
  - coordinates: 5.2489°S 74.3597°W
- Length: 400 km (250 mi)

The Pacaya River is a river in Peru. It is a left-bank tributary of the Ucayali River and forms part of the Amazon Basin. There is little elevation difference from source to mouth and the seasonally flooded wetland of the Pacaya Basin forms part of the Pacaya-Samiria National Reserve. The 400-km long Pacaya flows into the Ucayali at Bretaña.
