= Tapiche River =

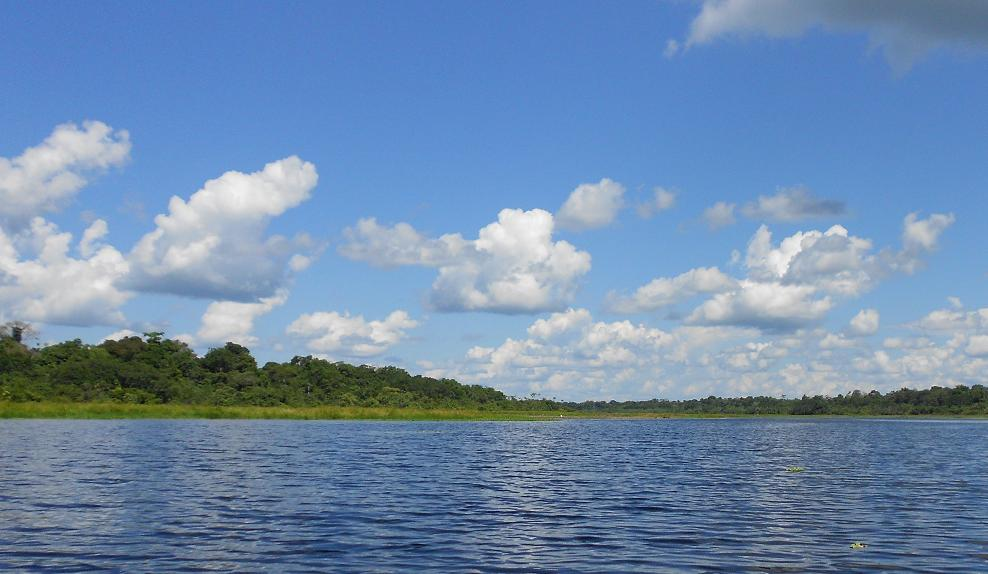

Location
- Country: Peru

Physical characteristics
- Mouth: Ucayli River
- Length: 480 km (300 mi)

The Tapiche River is a river in Peru. The 480-km Tapiche is a right tributary of the Ucayali River.
