= Nauta =

Town in the Peruvian Amazon

Nauta Santiago de Nauta
- City
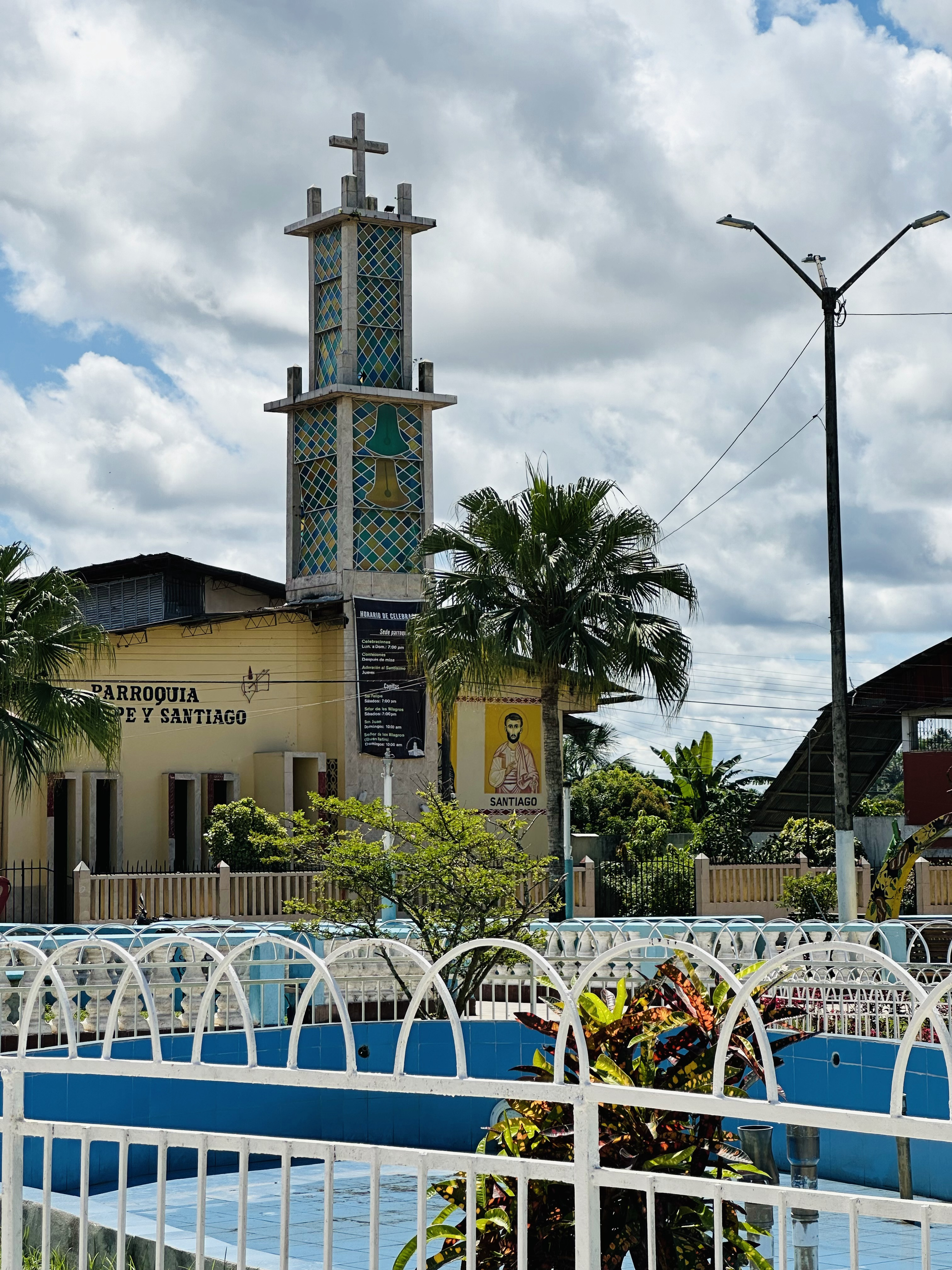
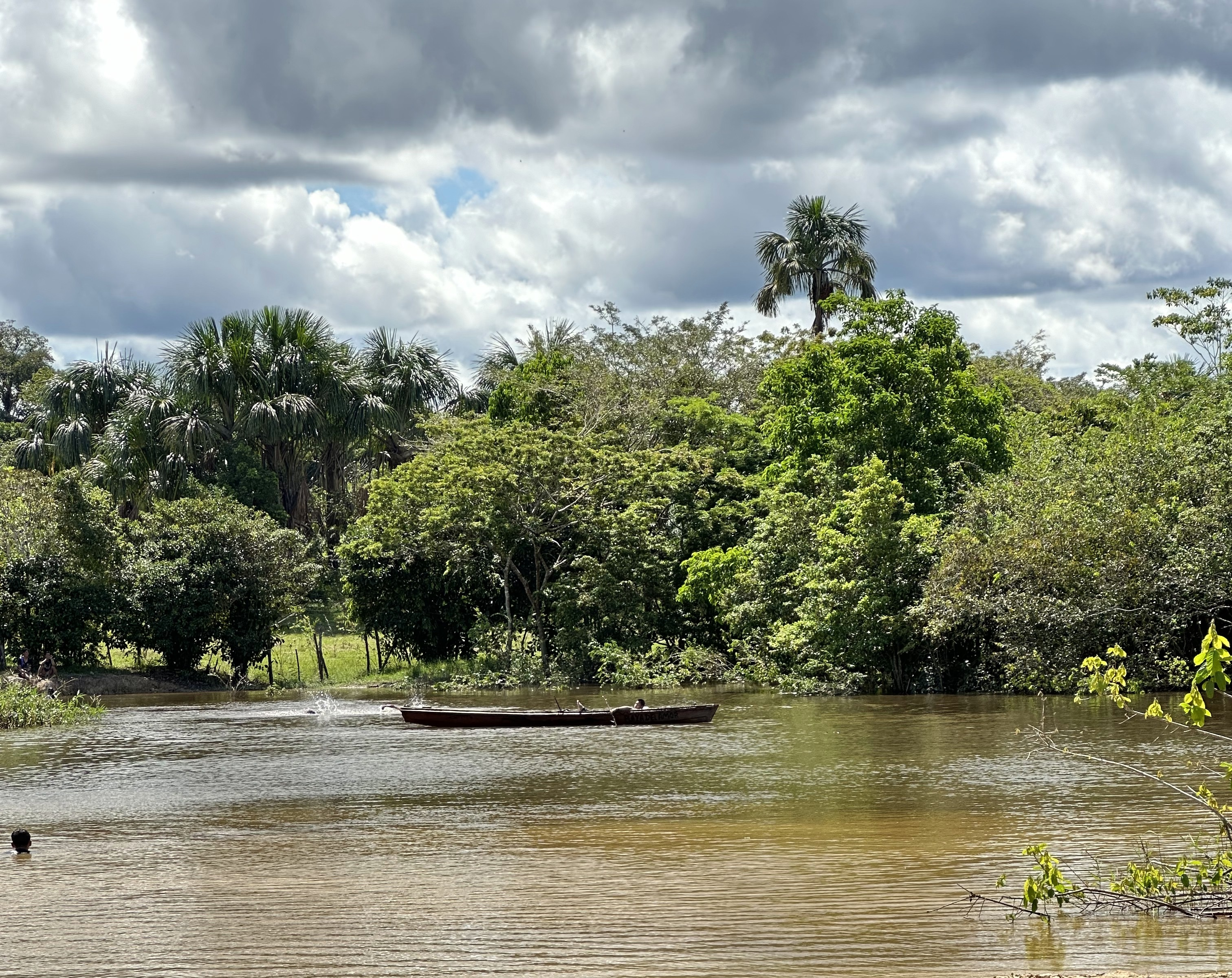
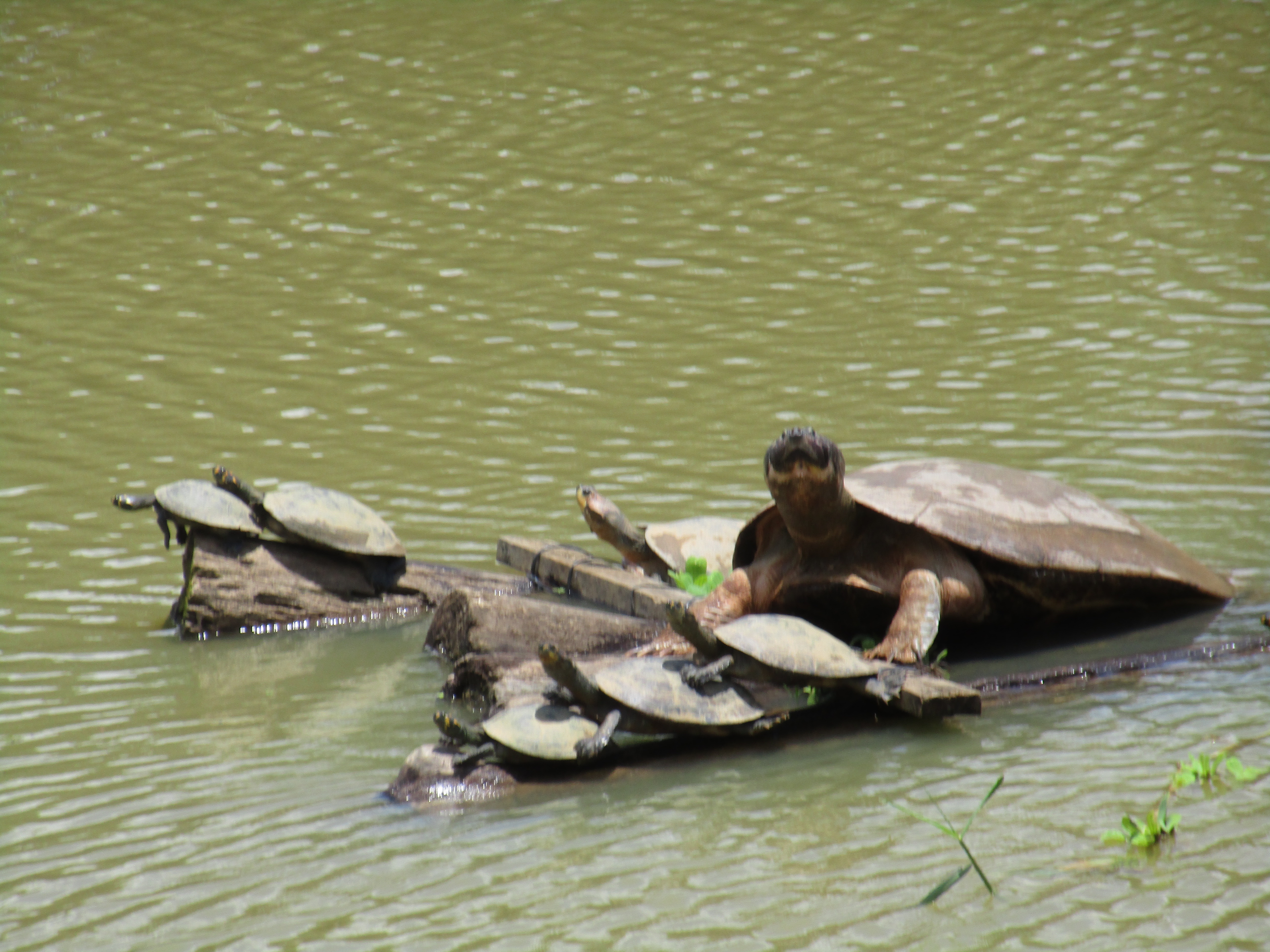
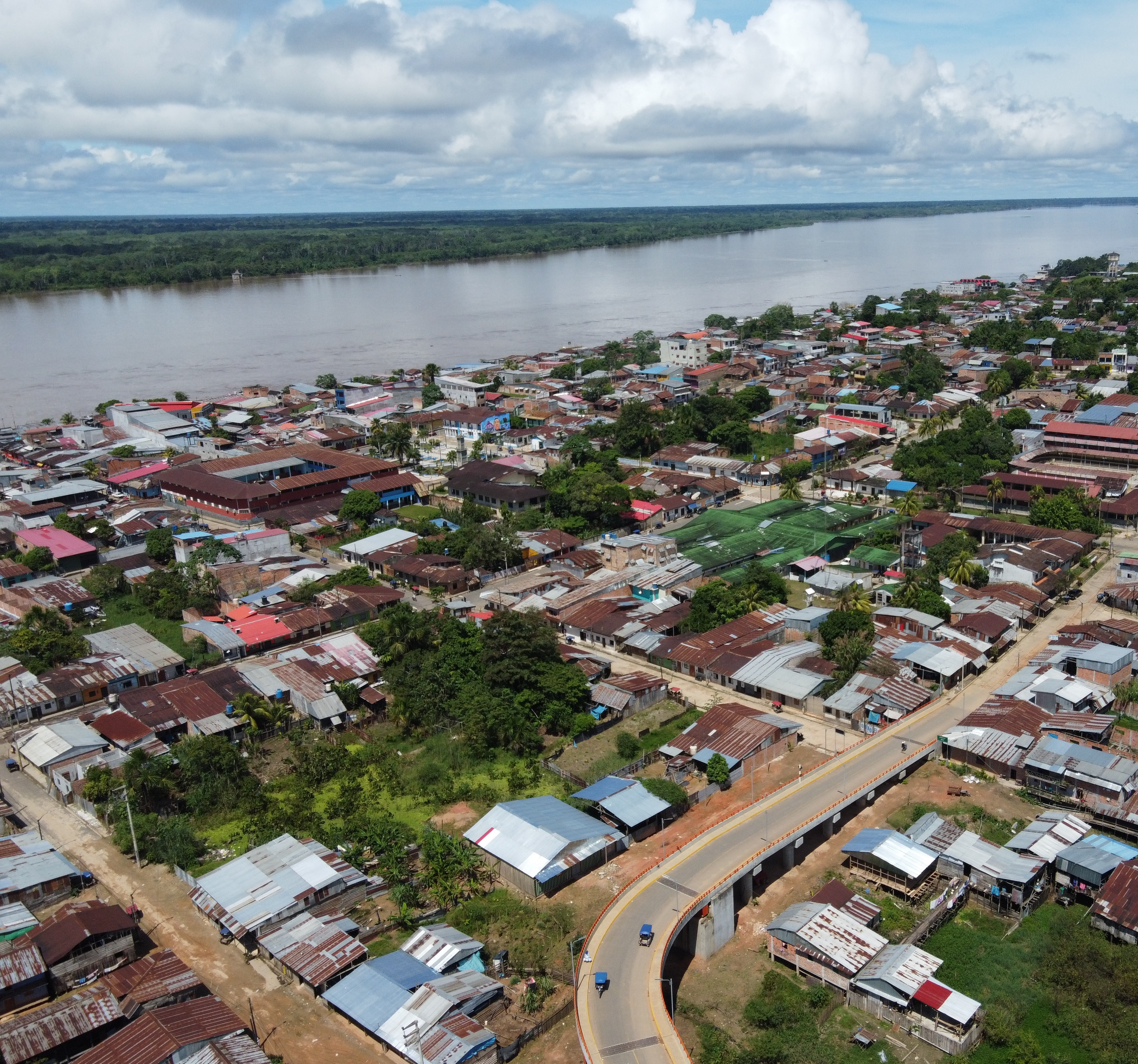
- View of the main church. Playa del Amor, Tourist Resort. Charapa turtles of all ages in the Sapi Sapi Lagoon. View of the city of Nauta facing the Marañón River
- Interactive map of Nauta
- Country: Peru
- Region: Loreto
- Province: Loreto
- District: Nauta
- Founded: 1830

Government
  - Mayor: Jose Daniel Saboya Mayanchi
- Elevation: 111 m (364 ft)

Population (2022)
  - Total: 34,762 population
- Time zone: UTC-5 (PET)
- Climate: Af
- Website: www.muninauta.gob.pe

Interactive Map

Nauta is a town in the northeastern part of Loreto Province in the Peruvian Amazon, roughly 62 miles (100 km) south of Iquitos, the provincial capital. Nauta is located on the north bank of the Marañón River, a major tributary of the Upper Amazon, a few miles from the confluence of the Río Ucayali.

Established by Manuel Pacaya–Samiria, a leader of the Kokama people, following the 1830 uprising at the Jesuit mission of Lagunas, Nauta soon became the primary commercial hub of the Peruvian selva baja (known also as Omagua, or the Amazonian lowlands). In 1853, a Brazilian-owned paddle steamer made it all the way to Nauta.

Nauta is the primary destination of the only major road leading out of Iquitos, and is a staging area for several ecotourism lodges and ships on the Marañòn River. Boats take passengers from Nauta to the Pacaya-Samiria National Reserve.

== History ==
Towards the end of the second decade of the 19th century, Chief Manuel Pacaya, leader of a group of Cocama natives in the town of La Laguna (now Lagunas, on the Huallaga River), frustrated and tired of the mistreatment they received from authorities, along with his group, constructed a raft. They abandoned the said town and headed to the Ucayali River. After many days of navigation, they anchored and camped on the banks of the Marañón River near its confluence with the Ucayali River. While clearing the area where they would camp, they found an abandoned large jar that, due to its size, was called "MAUTA" in their native language, giving rise to the name of the place. Since they liked the location, they decided to settle there. They approached Mr. Damián Najar, Subprefect of Maynas based in Moyobamba, to request authorization to establish a town there. During this process, the name "MAUTA" was changed to "NAUTA," which means sailor or navigator.

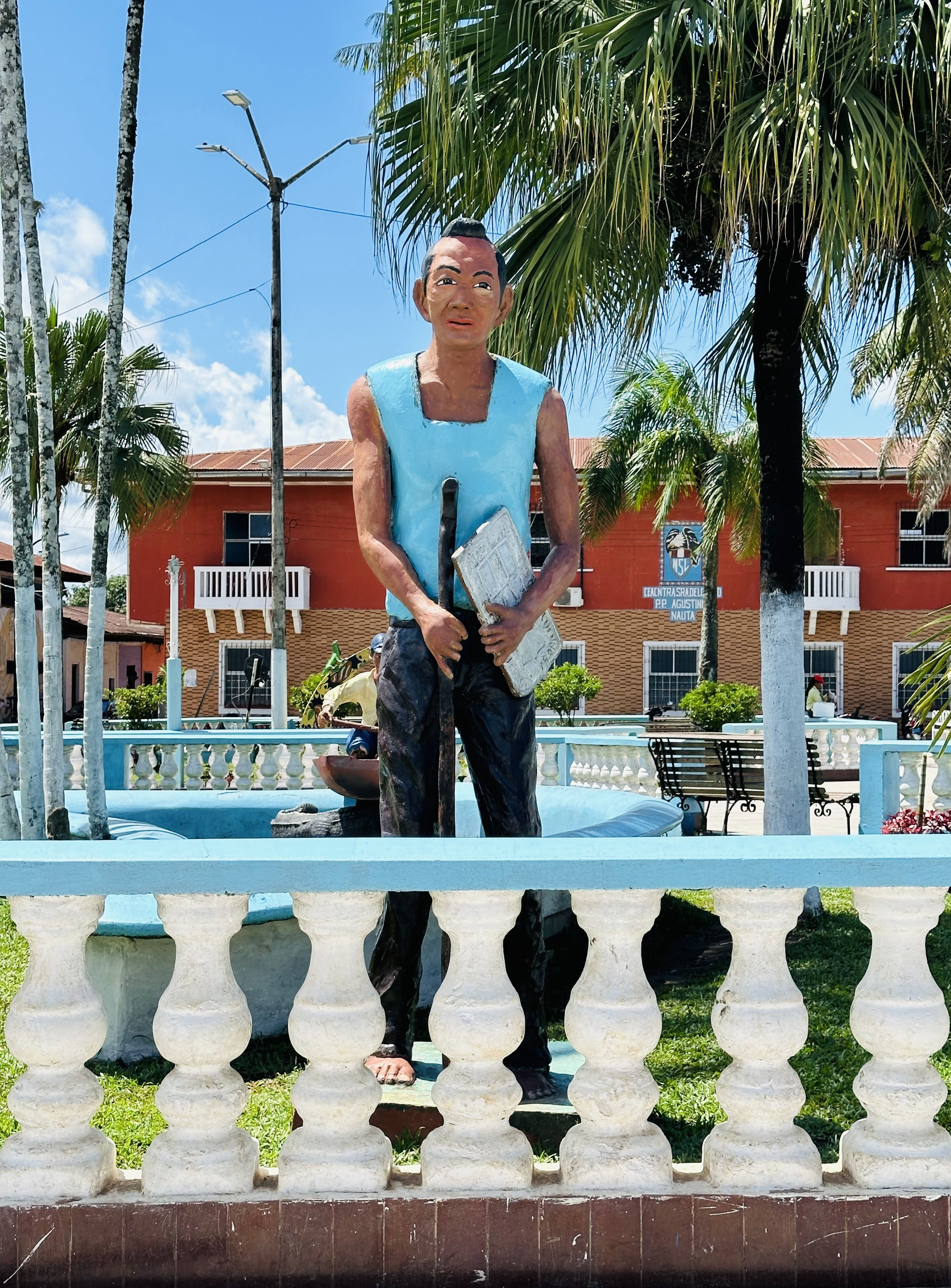
Statue of the founder of Nauta in the main square

The Subprefect responded to the request with a document dated December 17, 1829, addressed to the Governor of Misiones based on the official communication from the Prefect of the department, giving the following instructions:

"Take all possible measures for the Cocama tribe to move to the Mouth of the Ucayali, at the point named Nauta, to establish a town there. This is because Chief Manuel Pacaya has offered to do so in this Subprefecture. Always consult the order of the population in its streets, houses, and the best position that can be beneficial for the conservation and propagation of the new founders and their descendants. Provide that the population is established in an apparent place with good entrances and exits. When it is necessary to be by the riverbank, bear in mind that the title of the formation of this new town is that of a separate government, subject to the spiritual jurisdiction of the parish of San Regis. Its name should be according to the will of the aforementioned chief who has committed to founding it. He will remain, for now, while obtaining jurisdiction over his associates in civil and domestic matters. Still, always subject to the Government of Misiones, which will proceed to issue the corresponding permit following this office, which will be delivered to Don Manuel Pacaya so that he can carry out the new settlement without any hindrance. You will try to assist him as much as possible and conducive to the same purpose. It is your duty to report to this Subprefecture within the term of the state in which the population and its inhabitants are found, by means of which the chief will be informed, within the same period granted to him, to resolve what is convenient. May God protect you. Damian Najar."

On the same date, Don Damián Najar also sends a letter to Father Mariano, the priest of San Regis, informing him of the authorization given to Don Manuel Pacaya to establish the town of Nauta "to serve the republic as a separate government or district," with the obligation that within one year, he must have constructed the necessary buildings for the inhabitants, both for their social needs and divine worship, declaring them subject to the parish of San Regis.

The official founding of Nauta began on April 30, 1830. On the same day, the new Subprefect of the Province of Maynas, Don Carlos del Castillo, appoints citizen Juan Gosendi as the first interim Governor of the new town of Nauta, instructing him to:

"ensure its establishment in the best order and arrangement, with its streets, squares, and roads, entrances and exits, customs, and services, establishing that the houses be of sufficient consistency and formality,"etc.

It can be said that this document constitutes a sort of first regulation for the urban planning of Nauta.

Even though Nauta has an indigenous origin, from its beginnings, it adhered to the spirit of the foundations of Spanish-style towns, as this was in accordance with the full political, administrative, and religious control of the Maynas Missions that still persisted at the time despite the establishment of the republican era. In 1832, the construction of the Main Church (now Ukamara Theater) began, making this infrastructure the first historical and religious monument in this part of the Amazon, thus promoting the significance that the newly founded town was acquiring.

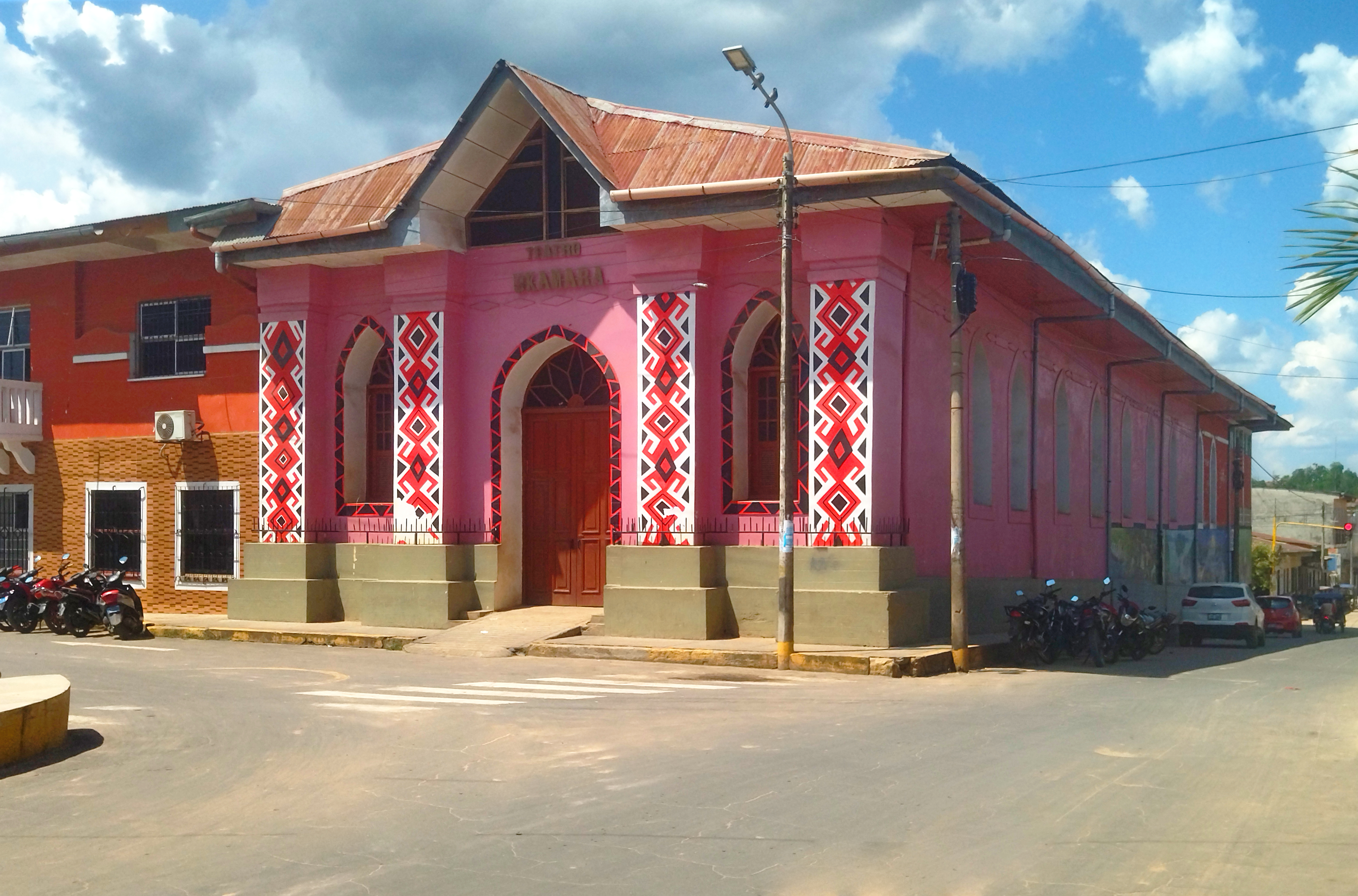
The Ucamara Theater, built in 1832 as the first church in Nauta, is considered the first historical and religious monument in this part of the Amazon. Due to its current construction, it serves as an auditorium owned by the congregation of the Augustinian Fathers.

Having started with a few indigenous families and being one of the early pioneering settlements in the Loreto region, Nauta quickly began its development not only in terms of population but also in all its economic and social activities. This is due to its river connection with other populated centers existing at the time, situated not only along the Marañón River but also along the Amazon River and even with the Amazonian villages in Brazil. These connections increased the flow of small watercraft such as rafts, canoes, and even ships.

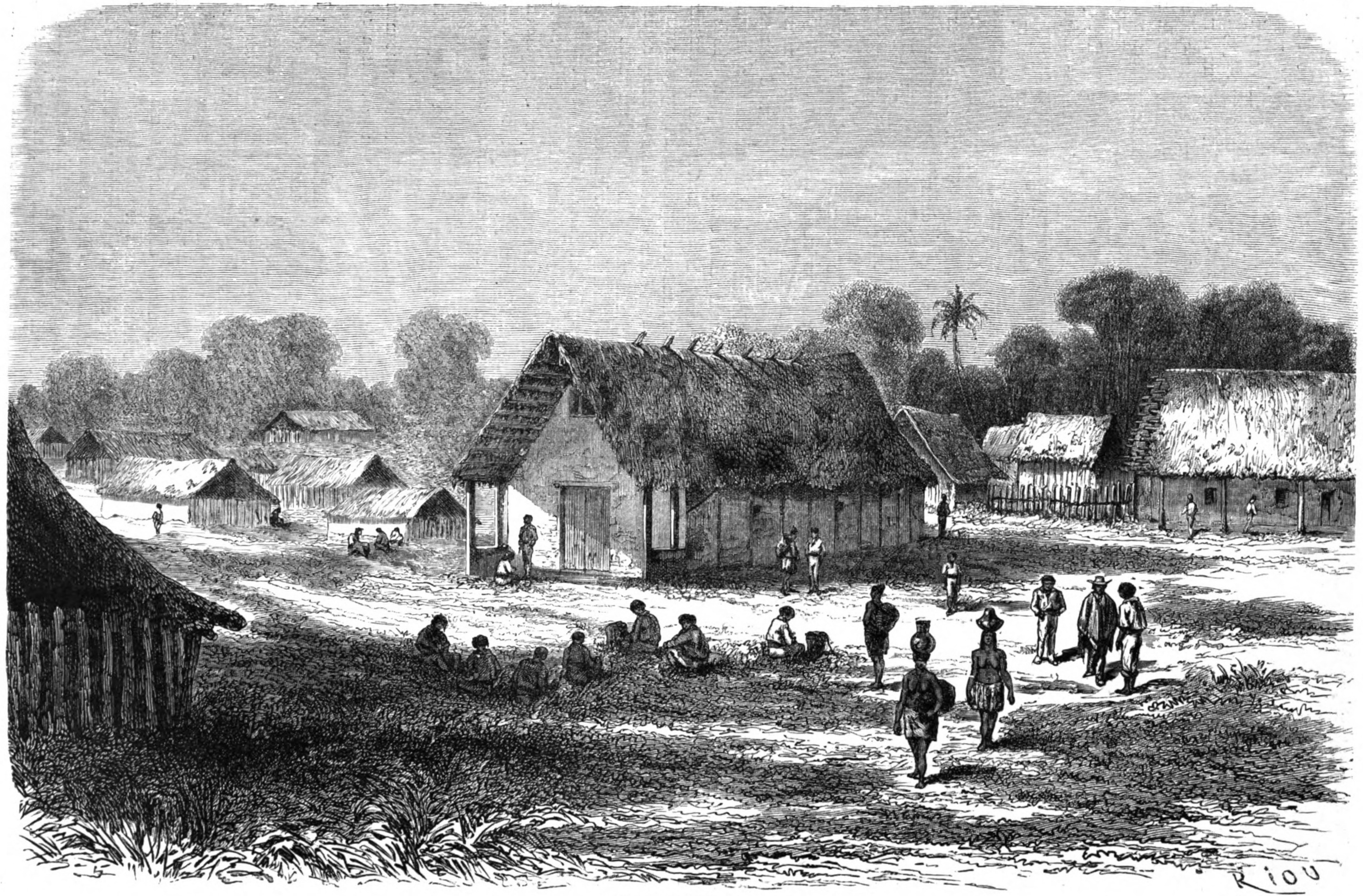
Engraving of Nauta: Illustration by Paul Marcoy, a French explorer who traveled through Peru between 1843 and 1861. He described the village of Nauta as a former Jesuit mission and, at the time, the district capital with 750 inhabitants, making it the most populated settlement in this area of the lowland jungle.

== Areas of interest ==
Nauta is home to many unique features of nature. One example is the Sapi Sapi lagoon, where many exotic animals are found, such as the Yellow-spotted river turtle, the pirarucu fish, crocodiles, and the Arrau turtle. For those interested in seeing these animals up close, the option to take a boat around the lagoon is available. According to legend, there was once a mysterious mermaid that attracted locals with her clothing and natural beauty.

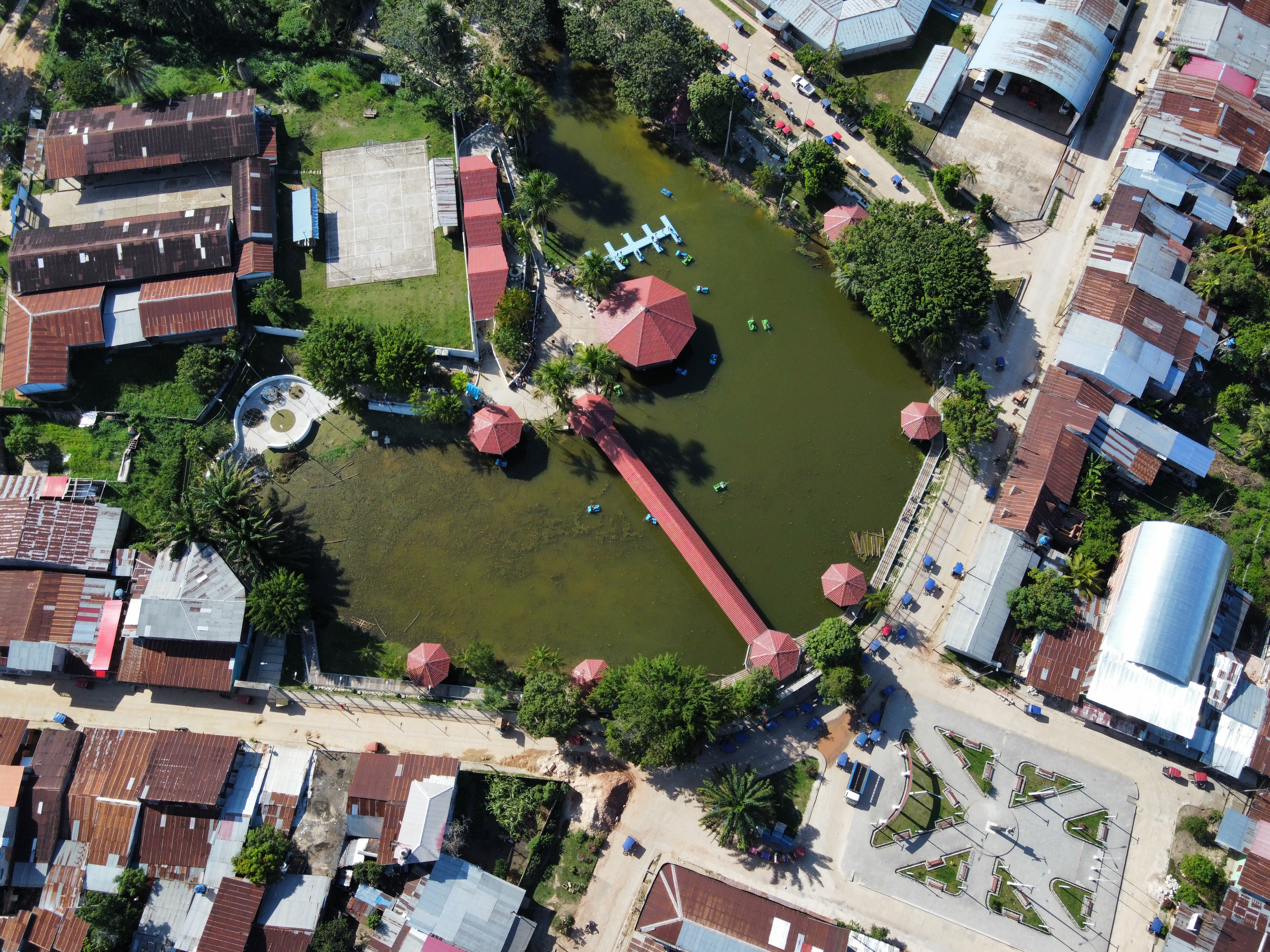
Sapi Sapi Lagoon

Another attraction is the Playa del Amor, located on the outskirts of Nauta and surrounded by jungle. Another highlight is the Quebrada Gasparito, another natural area that can be accessed by canoe and is known to be a relaxing getaway spot.

At the center of town is another attraction, the Plaza de Armas. It is characterized by the diversity of mythical statues made up by local residents that represent the native culture of the area. The Iglesia de Nauta, which is now used as a local parish theater, can also be found in the plaza, along with a school and bronze bust both named after Manuel Pacaya. A few streets past the plaza is the local marketplace where local customers and merchants from all over come to exchange goods.

Nauta is also the access point to the Pacaya-Samiria National Reserve. In order to enter the reserve, a permit must be purchased from the National Institute of Natural Resources (INRENA). Interested parties may enter by river through the community of 20 de febrero. Visitors will find that the Pacaya-Samiria National Reserve is one of the most biologically diverse places on the planet.

== Culture ==
In 2013, residents of Nauta created a children's rap video in the Kukama-Kukamiria dialect, in collaboration with Radio Ucamara. The local radio station has been involved in conserving the language for "a few years," and "started managing a school called Ikuar, with the goal of teaching the language through songs and traditional story telling."

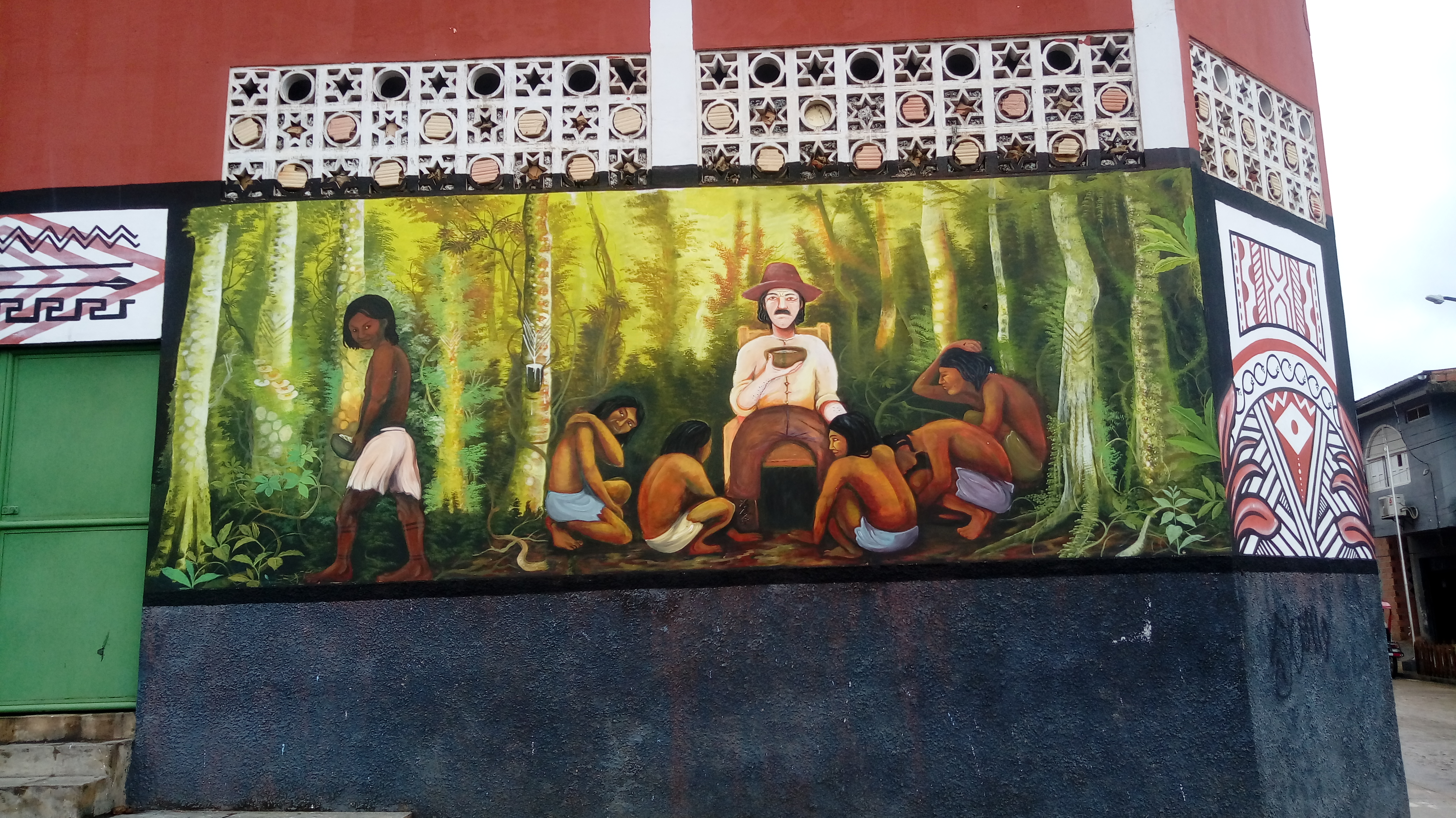
Mural about the rubber boom era in the Peruvian Amazon, located in the city of Nauta, Loreto.
