= Pacaya-Samiria National Reserve =

Peruvian nature reserve

Coordinates: 5°15′S 74°40′W

- Reserva Nacional Pacaya-Samiria
- IUCN category VI (protected area with sustainable use of natural resources)
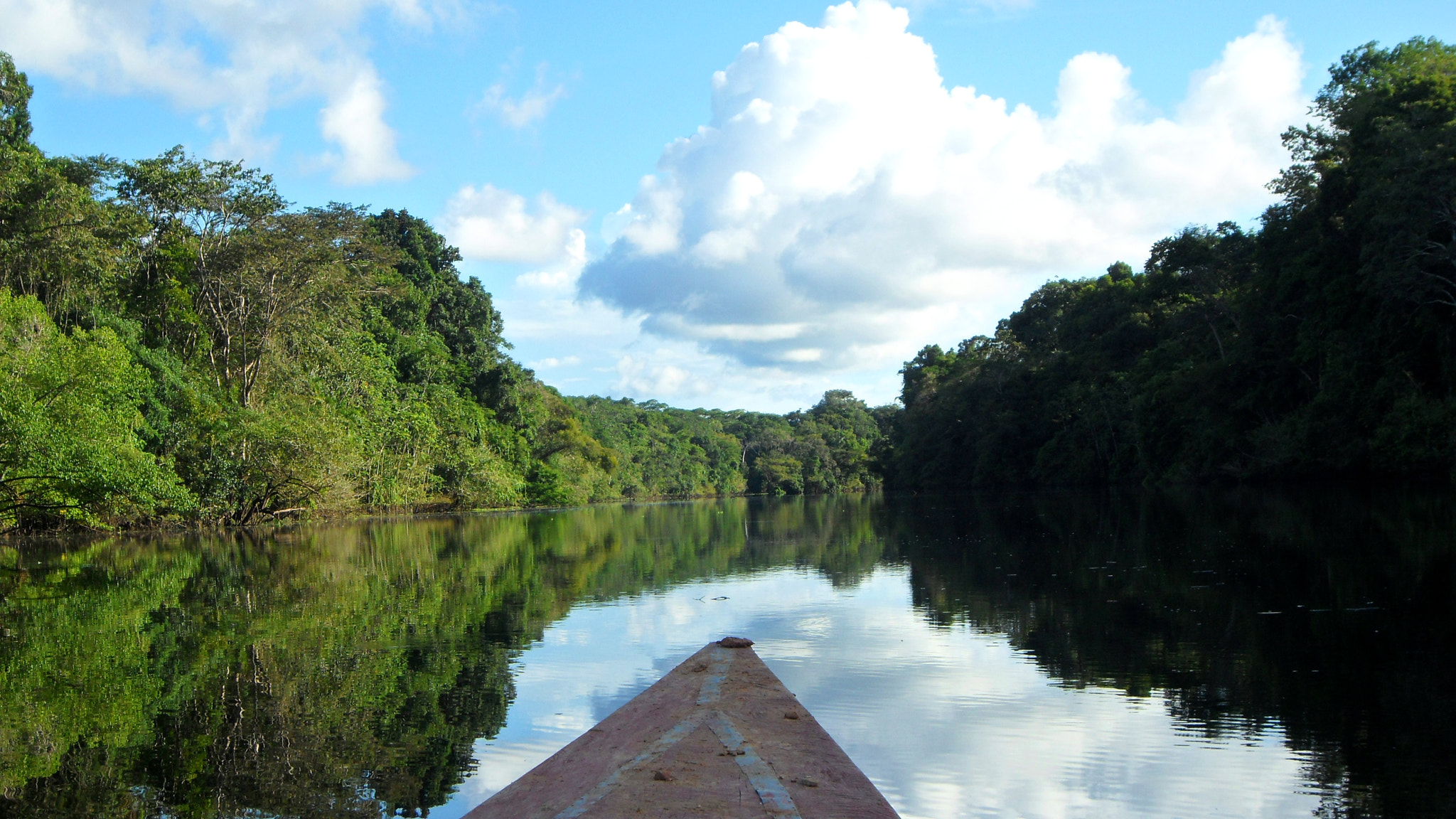
- River at Pacaya-Samiria National Reserve.
- Interactive map of Pacaya-Samiria National Reserve
- Location: Loreto, Peru
- Nearest city: Nauta
- Area: 20,800 km^{2} (8,000 mi^{2})
- Established: 4 February 1982

Ramsar Wetland
- Official name: Reserva Nacional Pacaya-Samiria
- Designated: 30 March 1992
- Reference no.: 546

Interactive Map:
Pacaya-Samiria National Reserve
Peru's Borders

Pacaya–Samiria National Reserve, is a protected area located in the region of Loreto, Peru. It spans an area of 20,800 km^{2} (8,000 mi^{2}). and protects an area of low hills and seasonally flooded forest in the Amazon rainforest. Pacaya-Samiria National Reserve and the near Tamshiyacu-Tahuayo Reserve both form a biodiversity hotspot in the Amazon jungle.

== Biodiversity ==
=== Flora ===
Some of the native plant species present in the reserve are: Spondias mombin, Quararibea cordata, Mauritia flexuosa, Parinari excelsa, Cedrela odorata, Ocotea spp., Myrciaria dubia, Socratea exorrhiza, Calathea allouia, Solanum sessiliflorum, Hevea guianensis, Pouteria caimito, Clidemia hirta, Ficus maxima, Heliconia psittacorum, Inga spp., Psychotria poeppigiana, Alibertia edulis, Victoria amazonica, Ceiba pentandra, Phytelephas macrocarpa, Clusia spp., Swietenia macrophylla, Asclepias curassavica, Pachira aquatica, Cragious Psychotria, etc.

=== Fauna ===
Mammal species found in the reserve include: the Amazonian manatee, the red-faced spider monkey, the South American tapir, the Bolivian squirrel, the Amazon river dolphin, the puma, the giant otter, the white-lipped peccary, the jaguar, the red brocket, the tucuxi, the South American coati, the capybara, etc.

Some species of fish found in the reserve are: Arapaima gigas, Pseudoplatystoma fasciatum, Phractocephalus hemiliopterus, Colossoma macropomum, Osteoglossum bicirrhosum, Potamotrygon motoro, Brycon melanopterus, Hyphessobrycon erythrostigma, Plagioscion squamosissimus, Prochilodus nigricans, etc.

Birds found in the reserve include: the Spix's guan, the black-bellied whistling duck, the king vulture, the crimson-crested woodpecker, the harpy eagle, the blue-and-yellow macaw, the scarlet macaw, the black-throated mango, the horned screamer, the cobalt-winged parakeet, the swallow-tailed hummingbird, etc.

== Climate ==
The annual mean temperature ranges between 20 and 33 °C, while the annual mean precipitation ranges between 2000 and 3000 mm. It is advisable to visit the reserve between May and January. The climograph shown here corresponds to the nearby town of Nauta (93 m of elevation).

Nauta

Climate chart (precipitation, max. and min. temperature)
J	F	M	A	M	J	J	A	S	O	N	D
257 32 22	234 32 22	259 31 22	261 31 22	203 31 22	173 31 22	115 31 21	128 32 21	171 32 21	199 33 22	204 32 22	244 32 22
- █ Average max. and min. temperatures in °C
- █ Precipitation totals in mm
- Source: Climate-Data.org
Imperial conversion
J	F	M	A	M	J	J	A	S	O	N	D
10 89 71	9.2 89 72	10 88 72	10 88 72	8 88 72	6.8 88 71	4.5 87 70	5 89 70	6.7 90 71	7.8 91 71	8 90 72	9.6 90 72
- █ Average max. and min. temperatures in °F
- █ Precipitation totals in inches

== Anthropology ==
Native peoples still inhabit the reserve, as well as more recent settlers.

== Recreation ==
The reserve has 15 authorized campsites distributed in 8 areas open for tourism; as well as 5 wilderness huts. Moreover, there are 19 park ranger stations (4 of them with information stands) and 21 neighborhood watch stations.

== See also ==
- Allpahuayo-Mishana National Reserve
- Pacaya River
