= Pachitea River =

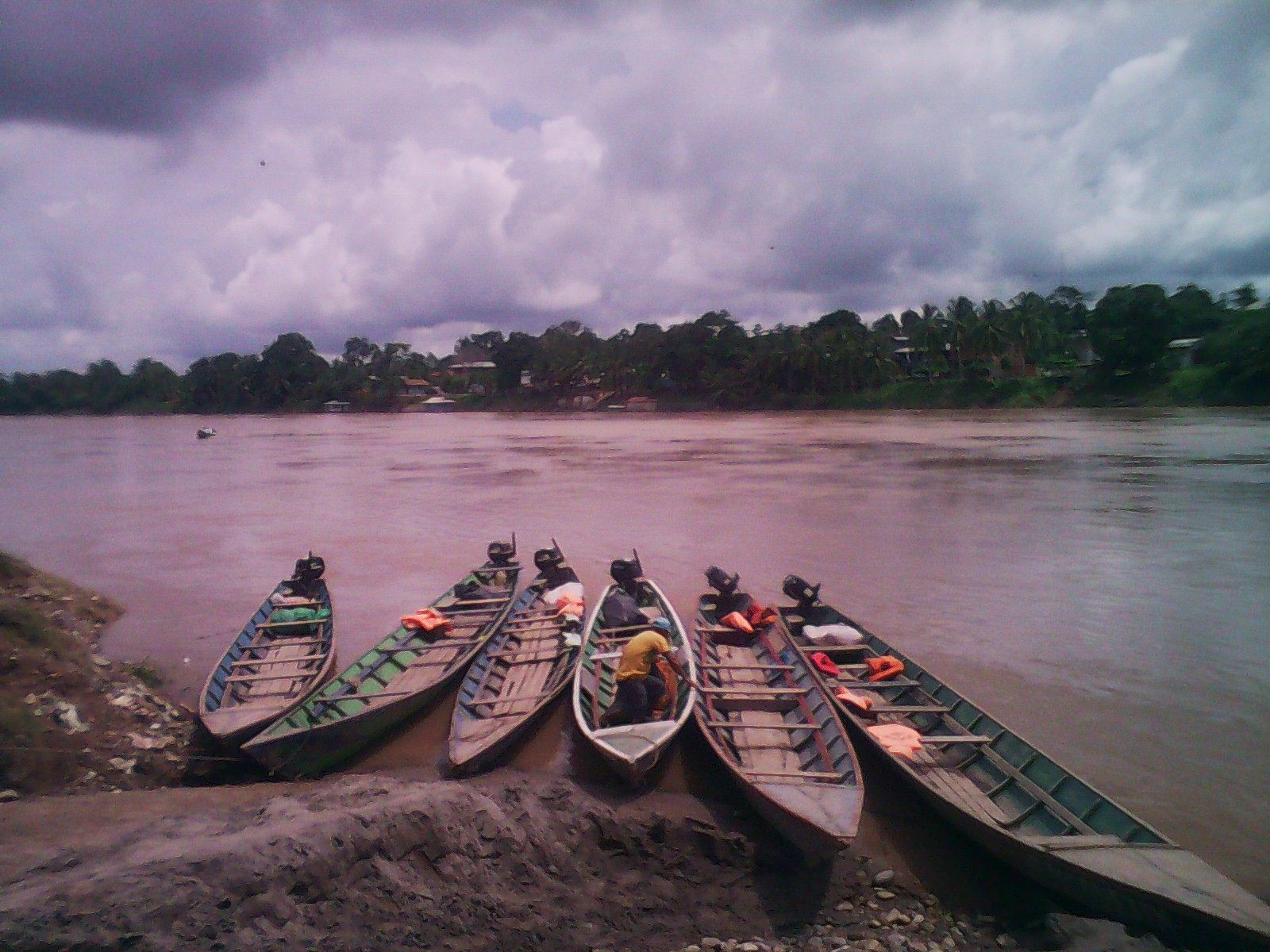

Location
- Country: Peru

Physical characteristics
- Mouth: Ucayali River
  - coordinates: 8°46′08″S 74°31′59″W
- Length: 530 km (330 mi)

The Pachitea River is a river in Peru. It is a left tributary of the Ucayali River.

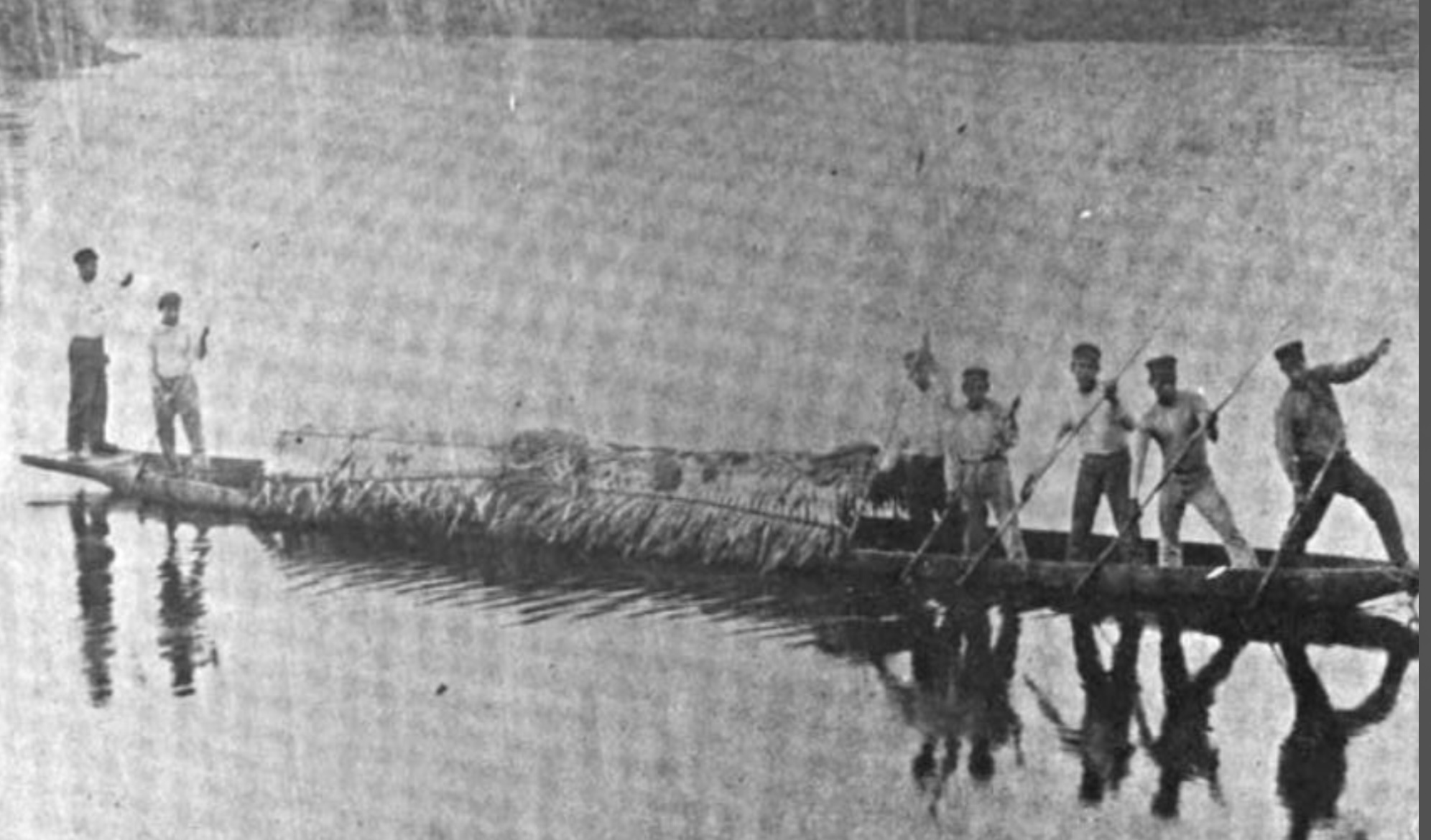
“Piros sailing the Pachitea River”
