= Ucayali River =

River in Peru

Coordinates: 8.59188°S 74.36646°W

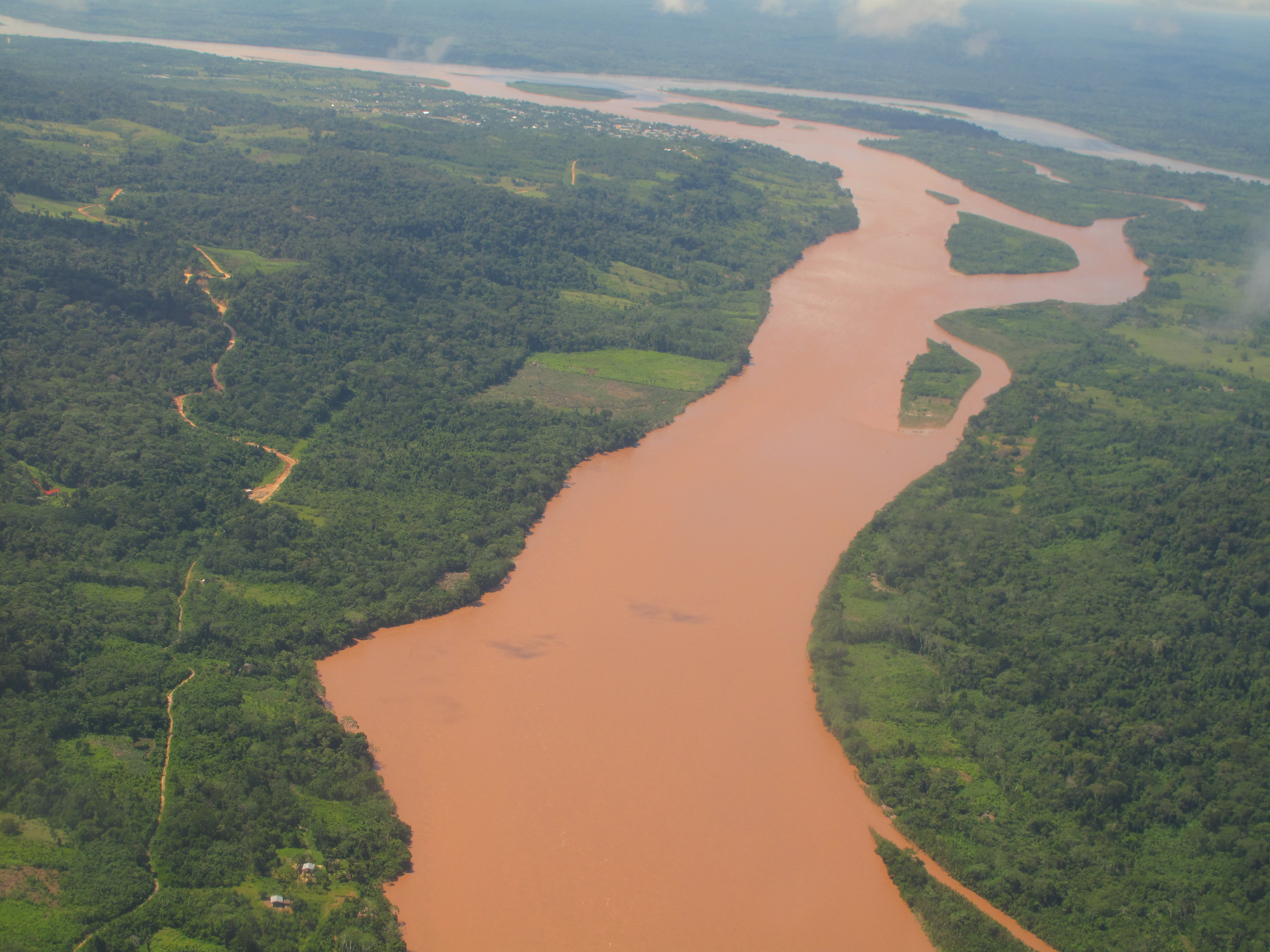
- Confluence of the Tambo (from bottom) and Urubamba Rivers (background right) forming the Ucayali River (background left)

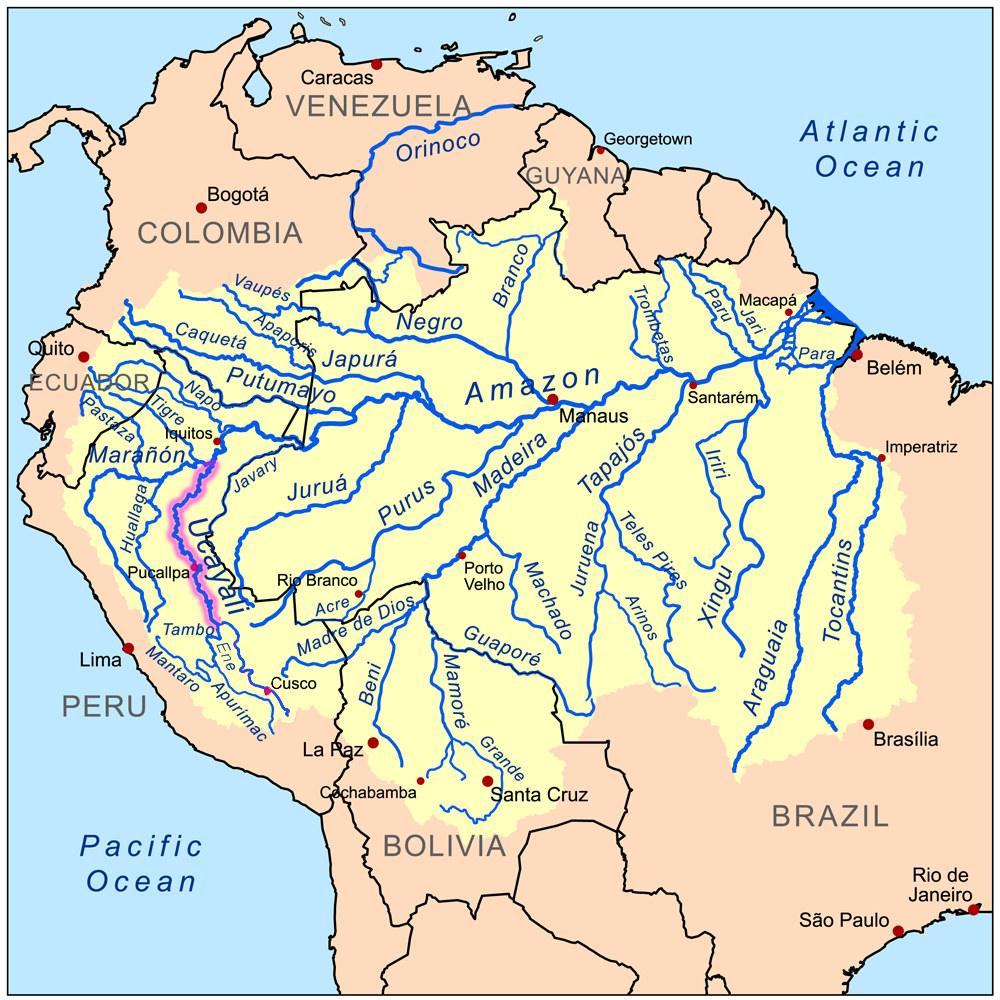
- Map of the Amazon Basin with the Ucayali River highlighted

Location
- Country: Peru
- Cities: Pucallpa

Physical characteristics
- Source: confluence of the Tambo and Urubamba Rivers
  - location: Atalaya, Ucayali, Peru
- Mouth: Amazon River
  - location: confluence with Marañón River, Loreto, Peru
- Length: 2,238 km (1,391 mi) 1,460 km (910 mi)
- Basin size: 351,549 km^{2} (135,734 mi^{2})
- Discharge
  - location: Requena, Peru
  - average: (Period of data: 1990–2006)13,385 m^{3}/s (472,700 cu ft/s) 13,500 m^{3}/s (480,000 cu ft/s) (Confluence of Marañón: ~13,800 m^{3}/s (490,000 cu ft/s))
  - minimum: 3,000 m^{3}/s (110,000 cu ft/s)
  - maximum: 28,000 m^{3}/s (990,000 cu ft/s)
- Discharge
  - location: Pucallpa, Peru (Basin size: 260,733 km^{2} (100,670 sq mi)
  - average: (Period of data: 1990–2006)8,931.2 m^{3}/s (315,400 cu ft/s)

Basin features
- Tributaries
  - left: Tambo, Pachitea, Aguaytia, Pacaya, Pisqui, Cushabatay
  - right: Urubamba, Tamaya, Tapiche

The Ucayali River (Spanish: Río Ucayali, IPA: [ˈri.o wkaˈʝali]) is the main headstream of the Amazon River. It rises about 110 km (68 mi) north of Lake Titicaca, in the Arequipa region of Peru and becomes the Amazon at the confluence of the Marañón close to Nauta city. The city of Pucallpa is located on the banks of the Ucayali.

== Description ==
The Ucayali, together with the Apurímac River, the Ene River and the Tambo River, is today considered the main headwater of the Amazon River, totaling a length of 2,669.9 kilometres (1,659.0 mi) from the source of the Apurímac at Nevado Mismi to the confluence of the Ucayali and Marañón Rivers:

- Apurímac River (total length): 730.7 km (454.0 mi)
- Ene River (total length): 180.6 km (112.2 mi)
- Tambo River (total length): 158.5 km (98.5 mi)
- Ucayali River (confluence with Tambo River to confluence with the Marañón): 1,600.1 km (994.3 mi)

== Exploration ==
The Ucayali was first called San Miguel, then Ucayali, Ucayare, Poro, Apu-Poro, Cocama and Rio de Cuzco. Peru has organised many costly and ably-conducted expeditions to explore it. One of them (1867) claimed to have reached within 380 km (240 mi) of Lima, and the little steamer "Napo" found its way up the violent currents for 124 km (77 mi) above the junction with the Pachitea River, and as far as the Tambo River, 1,240 km (770 mi) from the confluence of the Ucayali with the Amazon. The "Napo" then succeeded in ascending the Urubamba River 56 km (35 mi) upstream from its junction with the Tambo, to a point 320 km (200 mi) north of Cuzco.

== Rubber boom ==
During the first Amazon rubber boom, the Ucayali River basin and its indigenous inhabitants were heavily exploited for the collection of rubber. One of Peru's first rubber barons, Carlos Fitzcarrald, based his enterprise in the Ucayali and due to his success he became the richest rubber entrepreneur on the river by 1888. Many indigenous tribes along the Ucayali were targeted by rubber barons like Fitzcarrald during Correrias ("forays" or "chasings"), which were effectually slave raids. Some of the indigenous groups that were targeted include Asháninka, Amahuaca, Piro [Yine], Shipibo and Conibo.

Other prominent Peruvian rubber barons ran enterprises with operations on the Ucayali, including Luis Felipe Morey, along with his brother Adolfo, Julio Cesar Arana as well as the Rodriguez brothers Maximo and Baldomero. The latter of which was killed near the Sutilija tributary of the Manu River at his estate named Honoria in September of 1910 by a group of Piros.

Fitzcarrald's enterprise dominated the area around Atalaya, which is located near the Tambo and Urubamba River's confluence. According to anthropologist Søren Hvalkof, the "favourite focus of the Atalaya patrons’ correrías" were isolated Asháninka settlements around the Gran Pajonal and Ucayali.

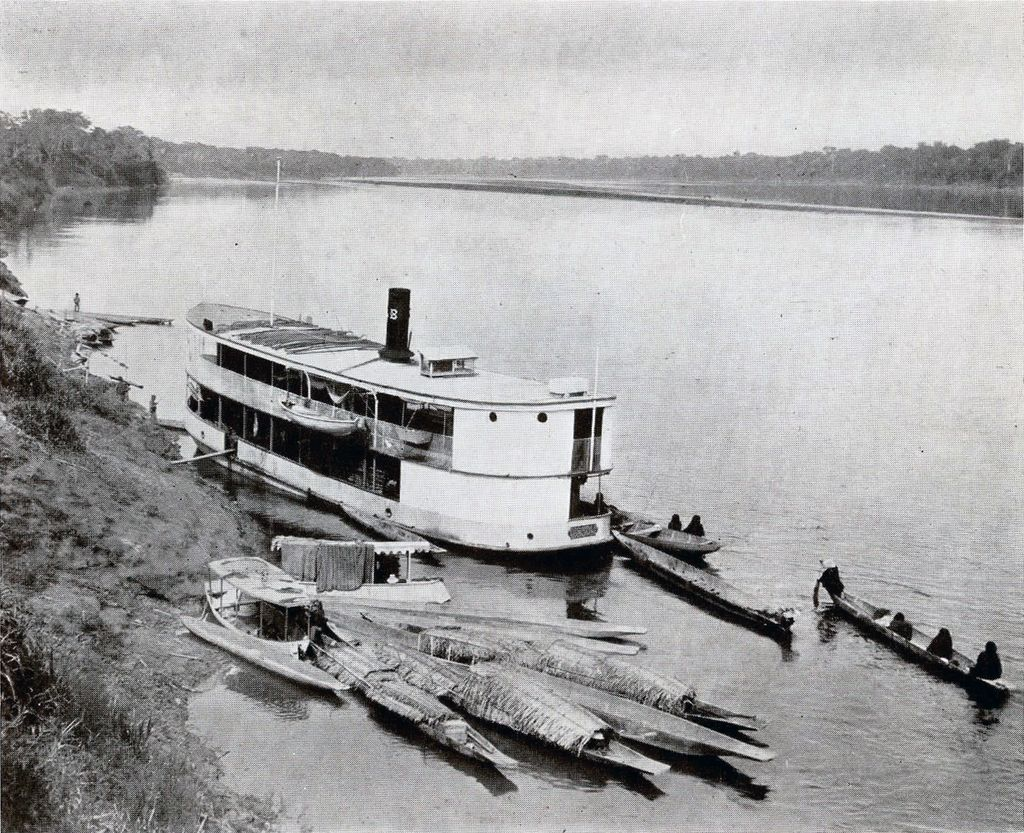
“Cumaria, Peru, head of navigation on the Ucayali River 3,000 miles from the sea.”

The work force in the form of slaves had at this time been converted into a commodity as part of the economy of the region. The correrías after indigenous slaves were common in all parts and involved all of the indigenous groups of the Ucayali. With the booming economy of rubber extraction, in 1880 human exploitation and perversion reached new heights

— Søren Hvalkof, Liberation through land rights

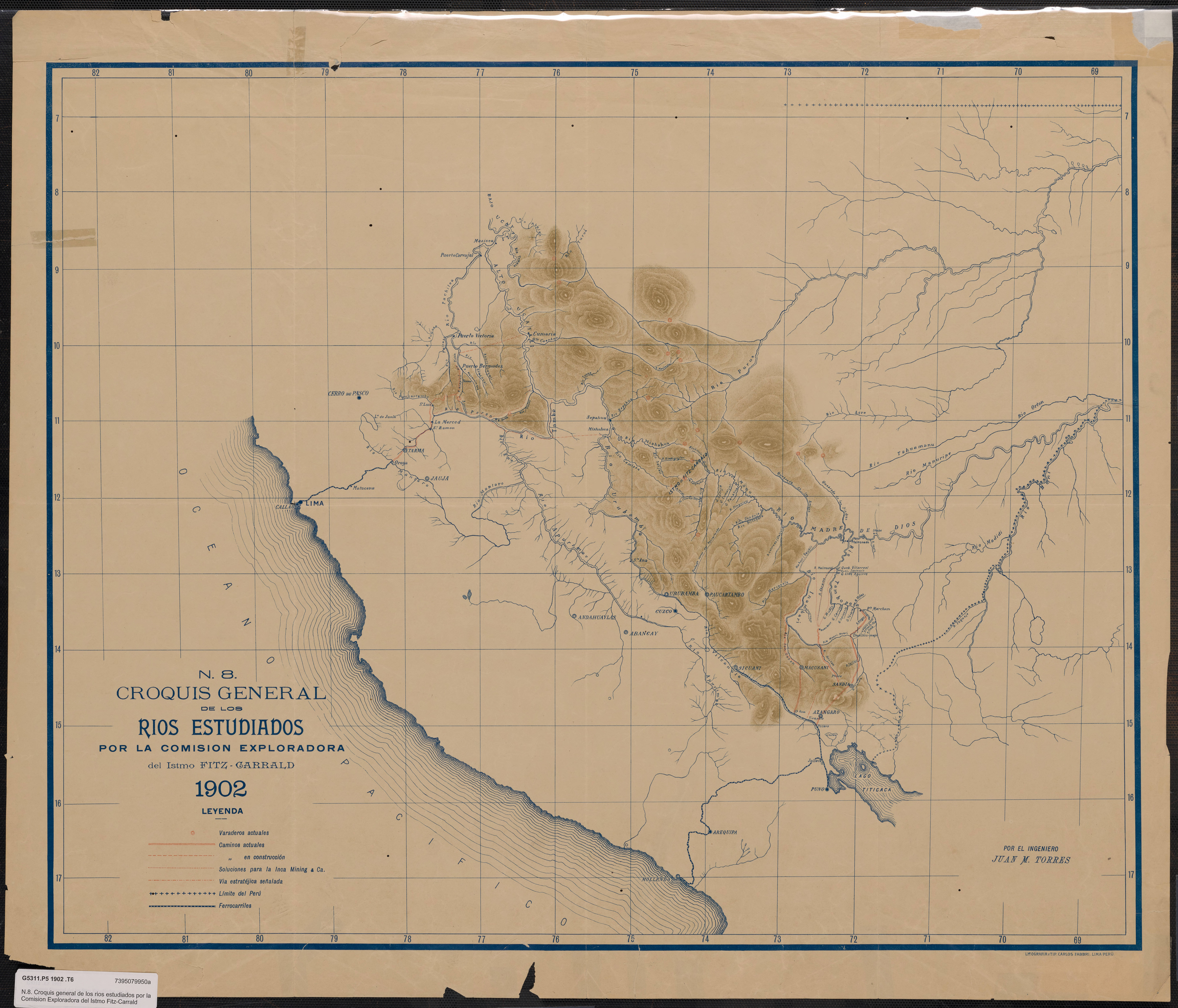
N.8. General sketch of the rivers studied by the Fitz-Carrald Isthmus Exploratory Commission

In 1893, Fitzcarrald was credited with establishing the Isthmus of Fitzcarrald, an important portage route between the Urubamba River, a tributary of the Ucayali, and the Manu tributary of the Madre de Dios River. In subsequent years, several other prominent rubber entrepreneurs, like Carlos Scharff and Leopoldo Collazos, attempted to establish portage routes which connected the Ucayali River to the Madre de Dios. The establishment of Fitzcarrald's portage route marked the beginning of Peruvian activity with the rubber trade in the Madre de Dios River basin. In July of 1897, Fitzcarrald and his partner Antonio Vaca Díez, a Bolivian rubber baron, drowned on the Urubamba after the steamship they were traveling on sank.

There were a series of indigenous uprisings against several slave traders along the Upper Ucayali River between 1910-1915. One of the first notable uprisings, which occurred on September 24 of 1910, resulted in the death of Baldomero Rodríguez along with eleven of his employees and several Asháninkas that were working with Rodríguez. Roger Casement wrote that Baldomero and his brother Maximo operated "the biggest [Peruvian] firm of 'caucheros' on the Madre de Dios." Casement also noted that the two brothers also operated on a large scale along the Ucayali and Marañón. A Peruvian only referred to as "J. Bezada" led a punitive expedition which investigated the site of this mutiny and sought to capture the indigenous people deemed responsible.

An estate owned by Antonio Bezada located near the Unini tributaries confluence with the Ucayali was attacked on November 13 of 1911 by a group of Asháninka. Antonio and his son managed to escape from the attack however Antonio was arrested then sent to prison in Lima due to being implicated with child trafficking, he died shortly after his incarceration. Antonio was known to "exchange Winchester rifles and ammunition with the indigenous chiefs in exchange for children obtained during their raids on other Asháninka areas."

During the early days of January 1914, a group of Asháninka warriors attacked Puerto Yessup. Fifteen non-indigenous people, including César Lúrquin, were killed during this incident, their corpses were burned along with the settlement and mail stored there. Several publications, including La Prensa and Peru To-day ran articles about this attack, referring to it as a massacre. Peru To-day ran an article titled "Uprising of Chuncho Indians" which noted "[t]his is the second time within the space of a few weeks that the tribe has marked the eastern mail route with a trail of burning villages." La Prensa speculated that the attack at Puerto Yessup was expressly planned with an intent to kill César Lúrquin, who was an ex-police commissioner of the Putumayo River in 1907 and later the Upper Ucayali around 1912. The publication claimed that Lúrquin had survived three separate assassination attempts within the previous year. While La Prensa suggested that this attack was aggravated by the local "traffickers in human flesh": anthropologist Fernando Santos-Granero emphasized in his book Slavery and Utopia that while he was the police commissioner on the Putumayo River Lúrquin was accused of trafficking Huitoto children to Iquitos. Over this issue Santos-Granero wrote "[t]here is no doubt, therefore, that far from being a staunch enemy of the slave trade, as he and his associates claimed, Lúrquin was a trafficker who probably remained in this type of trade after being appointed commissioner of the Upper Ucayali."

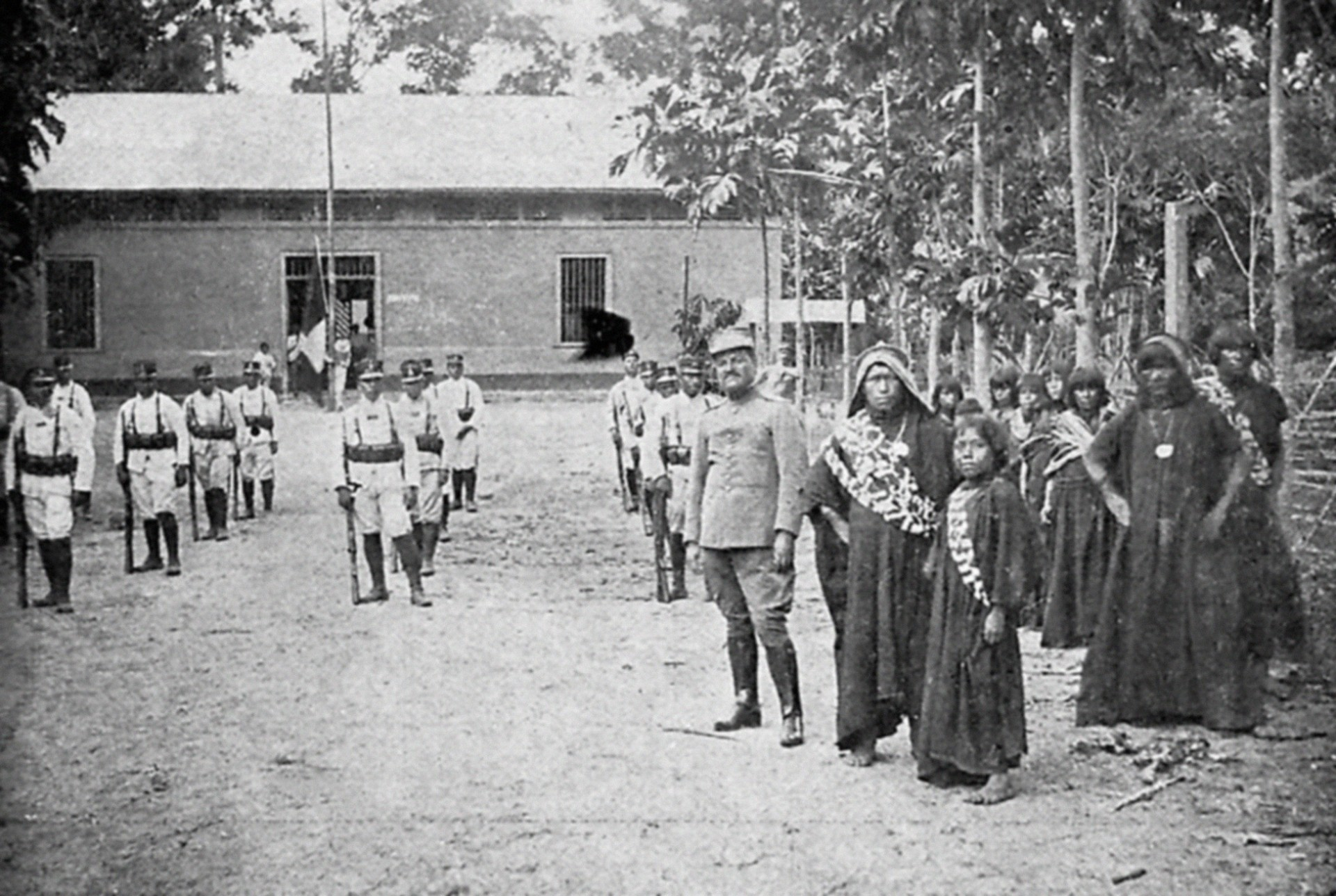
"Capt. Herrera and his troops, Perené Colony, June 1914."

An alliance of Asháninka, Conibo, Piro and Yine peoples launched a series of coordinated attacks against several important rubber producing estates along the Upper Ucayali on the morning of September 3, 1915. These estates included Cumaría, Casa Fitzcarrald, Sepa and Chicosta, respectively owned by Francisco and Fernando Franchinni, Federico and José Fitzcarrald, Francisco Vargas and another rubber entrepreneur. Santos-Granero emphasized that Vargas along with the Franchini and Fitzcarrald brothers "were all infamous slavers who controlled large indebted indigenous workforces."

== Navigation ==
The Ucayali's width varies from 400–1,200 metres (1,300–3,900 ft), due to the large number of islands. The current runs from 5–6 kilometres per hour (3.1–3.7 mph), and a channel from 20–50 metres (66–164 ft) wide can always be found with a minimum depth of 1.5 m (4.9 ft). There are five difficult passes, due to the accumulation of trees and rafts of timber. Sometimes large rocks which have fallen from the mountains and spread across the riverbed cause whirlpools.

== National Reserve ==
The Ucayali is home to the Amazon river dolphin, giant otter, and the Amazonian manatee, which are abundant in Pacaya-Samiria National Reserve, close to Nauta. The southeastern border of the reserve is formed by the lower Ucayali River.

The river gives its name to the Ucayali Region of Peru and the Ucayali Province of the Loreto Region.
